

455001–455100 

|-bgcolor=#d6d6d6
| 455001 ||  || — || October 6, 1999 || Kitt Peak || Spacewatch || — || align=right | 2.9 km || 
|-id=002 bgcolor=#E9E9E9
| 455002 ||  || — || October 8, 1994 || Kitt Peak || Spacewatch || — || align=right | 1.1 km || 
|-id=003 bgcolor=#fefefe
| 455003 ||  || — || September 29, 2000 || Kitt Peak || Spacewatch || MAS || align=right data-sort-value="0.86" | 860 m || 
|-id=004 bgcolor=#d6d6d6
| 455004 ||  || — || October 30, 2005 || Mount Lemmon || Mount Lemmon Survey || KOR || align=right | 1.2 km || 
|-id=005 bgcolor=#d6d6d6
| 455005 ||  || — || September 7, 2004 || Kitt Peak || Spacewatch || — || align=right | 2.3 km || 
|-id=006 bgcolor=#E9E9E9
| 455006 ||  || — || October 4, 2006 || Mount Lemmon || Mount Lemmon Survey || — || align=right | 2.9 km || 
|-id=007 bgcolor=#fefefe
| 455007 ||  || — || November 28, 2005 || Kitt Peak || Spacewatch || (883) || align=right data-sort-value="0.72" | 720 m || 
|-id=008 bgcolor=#E9E9E9
| 455008 ||  || — || January 14, 1996 || Kitt Peak || Spacewatch || — || align=right | 1.2 km || 
|-id=009 bgcolor=#d6d6d6
| 455009 ||  || — || October 1, 2005 || Mount Lemmon || Mount Lemmon Survey || EOS || align=right | 1.4 km || 
|-id=010 bgcolor=#d6d6d6
| 455010 ||  || — || November 3, 2004 || Kitt Peak || Spacewatch || — || align=right | 3.0 km || 
|-id=011 bgcolor=#E9E9E9
| 455011 ||  || — || April 16, 2009 || Catalina || CSS || — || align=right | 2.1 km || 
|-id=012 bgcolor=#d6d6d6
| 455012 ||  || — || October 28, 1994 || Kitt Peak || Spacewatch || — || align=right | 2.0 km || 
|-id=013 bgcolor=#d6d6d6
| 455013 ||  || — || January 26, 2006 || Kitt Peak || Spacewatch || — || align=right | 2.3 km || 
|-id=014 bgcolor=#fefefe
| 455014 ||  || — || December 30, 2005 || Mount Lemmon || Mount Lemmon Survey || — || align=right data-sort-value="0.74" | 740 m || 
|-id=015 bgcolor=#fefefe
| 455015 ||  || — || September 16, 2004 || Anderson Mesa || LONEOS || NYS || align=right data-sort-value="0.69" | 690 m || 
|-id=016 bgcolor=#E9E9E9
| 455016 ||  || — || March 8, 2005 || Kitt Peak || Spacewatch || — || align=right | 1.3 km || 
|-id=017 bgcolor=#d6d6d6
| 455017 ||  || — || August 7, 2004 || Campo Imperatore || CINEOS || — || align=right | 2.9 km || 
|-id=018 bgcolor=#d6d6d6
| 455018 ||  || — || December 7, 1999 || Kitt Peak || Spacewatch || — || align=right | 3.0 km || 
|-id=019 bgcolor=#d6d6d6
| 455019 ||  || — || December 2, 2010 || Mount Lemmon || Mount Lemmon Survey || EOS || align=right | 2.5 km || 
|-id=020 bgcolor=#d6d6d6
| 455020 ||  || — || March 13, 2007 || Mount Lemmon || Mount Lemmon Survey || — || align=right | 4.0 km || 
|-id=021 bgcolor=#fefefe
| 455021 ||  || — || June 16, 2007 || Kitt Peak || Spacewatch || — || align=right data-sort-value="0.94" | 940 m || 
|-id=022 bgcolor=#fefefe
| 455022 ||  || — || May 1, 2003 || Kitt Peak || Spacewatch || — || align=right data-sort-value="0.98" | 980 m || 
|-id=023 bgcolor=#d6d6d6
| 455023 ||  || — || January 26, 2007 || Kitt Peak || Spacewatch || — || align=right | 3.6 km || 
|-id=024 bgcolor=#d6d6d6
| 455024 ||  || — || May 27, 2003 || Kitt Peak || Spacewatch || — || align=right | 3.1 km || 
|-id=025 bgcolor=#E9E9E9
| 455025 ||  || — || December 12, 1999 || Kitt Peak || Spacewatch || KON || align=right | 2.1 km || 
|-id=026 bgcolor=#E9E9E9
| 455026 ||  || — || May 13, 1997 || Kitt Peak || Spacewatch || — || align=right | 2.0 km || 
|-id=027 bgcolor=#d6d6d6
| 455027 ||  || — || February 3, 2012 || Mount Lemmon || Mount Lemmon Survey || VER || align=right | 2.8 km || 
|-id=028 bgcolor=#fefefe
| 455028 ||  || — || September 23, 2000 || Anderson Mesa || LONEOS || MAS || align=right | 1.1 km || 
|-id=029 bgcolor=#E9E9E9
| 455029 ||  || — || November 18, 2003 || Kitt Peak || Spacewatch || — || align=right data-sort-value="0.80" | 800 m || 
|-id=030 bgcolor=#d6d6d6
| 455030 ||  || — || August 31, 2009 || Siding Spring || SSS || — || align=right | 4.3 km || 
|-id=031 bgcolor=#d6d6d6
| 455031 ||  || — || October 25, 2005 || Kitt Peak || Spacewatch || EOS || align=right | 1.7 km || 
|-id=032 bgcolor=#d6d6d6
| 455032 ||  || — || March 26, 2007 || Mount Lemmon || Mount Lemmon Survey || — || align=right | 2.6 km || 
|-id=033 bgcolor=#d6d6d6
| 455033 ||  || — || September 11, 2010 || Mount Lemmon || Mount Lemmon Survey || — || align=right | 2.8 km || 
|-id=034 bgcolor=#fefefe
| 455034 ||  || — || March 16, 2007 || Kitt Peak || Spacewatch || — || align=right data-sort-value="0.69" | 690 m || 
|-id=035 bgcolor=#fefefe
| 455035 ||  || — || November 18, 2008 || Kitt Peak || Spacewatch || — || align=right data-sort-value="0.99" | 990 m || 
|-id=036 bgcolor=#d6d6d6
| 455036 ||  || — || February 17, 2007 || Kitt Peak || Spacewatch || — || align=right | 2.6 km || 
|-id=037 bgcolor=#E9E9E9
| 455037 || 2015 UP || — || May 17, 2010 || WISE || WISE || DOR || align=right | 1.9 km || 
|-id=038 bgcolor=#d6d6d6
| 455038 ||  || — || February 3, 2006 || Kitt Peak || Spacewatch || — || align=right | 2.8 km || 
|-id=039 bgcolor=#fefefe
| 455039 ||  || — || November 1, 2000 || Socorro || LINEAR || — || align=right | 3.3 km || 
|-id=040 bgcolor=#E9E9E9
| 455040 ||  || — || February 10, 2008 || Catalina || CSS || — || align=right | 1.9 km || 
|-id=041 bgcolor=#fefefe
| 455041 ||  || — || November 4, 2004 || Catalina || CSS || — || align=right data-sort-value="0.78" | 780 m || 
|-id=042 bgcolor=#d6d6d6
| 455042 ||  || — || December 5, 2005 || Kitt Peak || Spacewatch || — || align=right | 3.0 km || 
|-id=043 bgcolor=#d6d6d6
| 455043 ||  || — || November 27, 2010 || Mount Lemmon || Mount Lemmon Survey || EOS || align=right | 2.1 km || 
|-id=044 bgcolor=#d6d6d6
| 455044 ||  || — || December 6, 2010 || Catalina || CSS || — || align=right | 3.3 km || 
|-id=045 bgcolor=#d6d6d6
| 455045 ||  || — || September 7, 2004 || Kitt Peak || Spacewatch || — || align=right | 2.7 km || 
|-id=046 bgcolor=#d6d6d6
| 455046 ||  || — || September 18, 1995 || Kitt Peak || Spacewatch || — || align=right | 2.4 km || 
|-id=047 bgcolor=#fefefe
| 455047 ||  || — || October 30, 2005 || Kitt Peak || Spacewatch || — || align=right data-sort-value="0.70" | 700 m || 
|-id=048 bgcolor=#fefefe
| 455048 ||  || — || October 8, 2004 || Kitt Peak || Spacewatch || — || align=right data-sort-value="0.90" | 900 m || 
|-id=049 bgcolor=#d6d6d6
| 455049 ||  || — || October 1, 2005 || Mount Lemmon || Mount Lemmon Survey || — || align=right | 2.1 km || 
|-id=050 bgcolor=#fefefe
| 455050 ||  || — || April 11, 2010 || Mount Lemmon || Mount Lemmon Survey || — || align=right data-sort-value="0.89" | 890 m || 
|-id=051 bgcolor=#E9E9E9
| 455051 ||  || — || September 25, 2006 || Kitt Peak || Spacewatch || — || align=right | 2.0 km || 
|-id=052 bgcolor=#E9E9E9
| 455052 ||  || — || August 18, 2006 || Kitt Peak || Spacewatch || — || align=right | 1.3 km || 
|-id=053 bgcolor=#E9E9E9
| 455053 ||  || — || October 12, 2007 || Kitt Peak || Spacewatch || (5) || align=right data-sort-value="0.59" | 590 m || 
|-id=054 bgcolor=#fefefe
| 455054 ||  || — || October 25, 2005 || Kitt Peak || Spacewatch || — || align=right data-sort-value="0.68" | 680 m || 
|-id=055 bgcolor=#fefefe
| 455055 ||  || — || October 23, 2008 || Mount Lemmon || Mount Lemmon Survey || V || align=right data-sort-value="0.54" | 540 m || 
|-id=056 bgcolor=#fefefe
| 455056 ||  || — || September 29, 2008 || Catalina || CSS || — || align=right data-sort-value="0.90" | 900 m || 
|-id=057 bgcolor=#d6d6d6
| 455057 ||  || — || January 12, 2002 || Kitt Peak || Spacewatch || — || align=right | 1.7 km || 
|-id=058 bgcolor=#fefefe
| 455058 ||  || — || January 25, 2009 || Kitt Peak || Spacewatch || — || align=right data-sort-value="0.68" | 680 m || 
|-id=059 bgcolor=#d6d6d6
| 455059 ||  || — || November 9, 1999 || Socorro || LINEAR || — || align=right | 3.0 km || 
|-id=060 bgcolor=#E9E9E9
| 455060 ||  || — || October 4, 2006 || Mount Lemmon || Mount Lemmon Survey || EUN || align=right | 1.7 km || 
|-id=061 bgcolor=#fefefe
| 455061 ||  || — || June 26, 2011 || Mount Lemmon || Mount Lemmon Survey || (6769) || align=right data-sort-value="0.75" | 750 m || 
|-id=062 bgcolor=#d6d6d6
| 455062 ||  || — || April 28, 2008 || Mount Lemmon || Mount Lemmon Survey || — || align=right | 2.2 km || 
|-id=063 bgcolor=#d6d6d6
| 455063 ||  || — || April 6, 2008 || Mount Lemmon || Mount Lemmon Survey || — || align=right | 2.7 km || 
|-id=064 bgcolor=#E9E9E9
| 455064 ||  || — || November 20, 2001 || Socorro || LINEAR || — || align=right | 2.0 km || 
|-id=065 bgcolor=#d6d6d6
| 455065 ||  || — || February 14, 2005 || Kitt Peak || Spacewatch || 7:4 || align=right | 5.0 km || 
|-id=066 bgcolor=#d6d6d6
| 455066 ||  || — || September 11, 2004 || Kitt Peak || Spacewatch || THM || align=right | 1.9 km || 
|-id=067 bgcolor=#fefefe
| 455067 ||  || — || April 3, 2008 || Mount Lemmon || Mount Lemmon Survey || — || align=right data-sort-value="0.55" | 550 m || 
|-id=068 bgcolor=#E9E9E9
| 455068 ||  || — || September 19, 2006 || Kitt Peak || Spacewatch || — || align=right | 1.9 km || 
|-id=069 bgcolor=#d6d6d6
| 455069 ||  || — || January 31, 2006 || Kitt Peak || Spacewatch || VER || align=right | 2.3 km || 
|-id=070 bgcolor=#fefefe
| 455070 ||  || — || February 2, 2006 || Kitt Peak || Spacewatch || — || align=right data-sort-value="0.81" | 810 m || 
|-id=071 bgcolor=#d6d6d6
| 455071 ||  || — || May 16, 2007 || Mount Lemmon || Mount Lemmon Survey || VER || align=right | 2.7 km || 
|-id=072 bgcolor=#fefefe
| 455072 ||  || — || December 14, 2001 || Socorro || LINEAR || — || align=right data-sort-value="0.79" | 790 m || 
|-id=073 bgcolor=#d6d6d6
| 455073 ||  || — || September 6, 2008 || Catalina || CSS || 7:4 || align=right | 4.3 km || 
|-id=074 bgcolor=#d6d6d6
| 455074 ||  || — || November 10, 2004 || Kitt Peak || Spacewatch || — || align=right | 3.7 km || 
|-id=075 bgcolor=#d6d6d6
| 455075 ||  || — || February 21, 2006 || Catalina || CSS || VER || align=right | 4.1 km || 
|-id=076 bgcolor=#d6d6d6
| 455076 ||  || — || December 27, 2005 || Kitt Peak || Spacewatch || — || align=right | 3.6 km || 
|-id=077 bgcolor=#d6d6d6
| 455077 ||  || — || October 23, 2006 || Mount Lemmon || Mount Lemmon Survey || — || align=right | 3.9 km || 
|-id=078 bgcolor=#fefefe
| 455078 ||  || — || February 10, 1999 || Kitt Peak || Spacewatch || — || align=right data-sort-value="0.67" | 670 m || 
|-id=079 bgcolor=#fefefe
| 455079 ||  || — || February 14, 2010 || Mount Lemmon || Mount Lemmon Survey || — || align=right | 1.0 km || 
|-id=080 bgcolor=#fefefe
| 455080 ||  || — || September 3, 2007 || Catalina || CSS || — || align=right data-sort-value="0.86" | 860 m || 
|-id=081 bgcolor=#fefefe
| 455081 ||  || — || October 25, 2005 || Kitt Peak || Spacewatch || — || align=right data-sort-value="0.69" | 690 m || 
|-id=082 bgcolor=#E9E9E9
| 455082 ||  || — || August 13, 2006 || Siding Spring || SSS || — || align=right | 2.1 km || 
|-id=083 bgcolor=#E9E9E9
| 455083 ||  || — || February 10, 1996 || Kitt Peak || Spacewatch || (5) || align=right data-sort-value="0.82" | 820 m || 
|-id=084 bgcolor=#E9E9E9
| 455084 ||  || — || August 21, 2006 || Kitt Peak || Spacewatch || — || align=right | 1.4 km || 
|-id=085 bgcolor=#d6d6d6
| 455085 ||  || — || January 31, 2006 || Kitt Peak || Spacewatch || — || align=right | 2.3 km || 
|-id=086 bgcolor=#fefefe
| 455086 ||  || — || December 19, 2003 || Kitt Peak || Spacewatch || — || align=right data-sort-value="0.54" | 540 m || 
|-id=087 bgcolor=#d6d6d6
| 455087 ||  || — || December 14, 2004 || Socorro || LINEAR || — || align=right | 3.0 km || 
|-id=088 bgcolor=#E9E9E9
| 455088 ||  || — || January 9, 2007 || Mount Lemmon || Mount Lemmon Survey || — || align=right | 1.9 km || 
|-id=089 bgcolor=#fefefe
| 455089 ||  || — || July 26, 2011 || Siding Spring || SSS || — || align=right | 1.4 km || 
|-id=090 bgcolor=#fefefe
| 455090 ||  || — || December 31, 2007 || Catalina || CSS || H || align=right data-sort-value="0.80" | 800 m || 
|-id=091 bgcolor=#d6d6d6
| 455091 ||  || — || September 30, 2005 || Mount Lemmon || Mount Lemmon Survey || EOS || align=right | 1.9 km || 
|-id=092 bgcolor=#E9E9E9
| 455092 ||  || — || November 30, 2011 || Kitt Peak || Spacewatch || — || align=right | 1.5 km || 
|-id=093 bgcolor=#fefefe
| 455093 ||  || — || October 13, 2001 || Kitt Peak || Spacewatch || V || align=right data-sort-value="0.58" | 580 m || 
|-id=094 bgcolor=#d6d6d6
| 455094 ||  || — || October 7, 2004 || Socorro || LINEAR || — || align=right | 3.2 km || 
|-id=095 bgcolor=#d6d6d6
| 455095 ||  || — || October 10, 2004 || Kitt Peak || Spacewatch || — || align=right | 3.4 km || 
|-id=096 bgcolor=#d6d6d6
| 455096 ||  || — || February 2, 2006 || Kitt Peak || Spacewatch || — || align=right | 2.6 km || 
|-id=097 bgcolor=#d6d6d6
| 455097 ||  || — || March 24, 2012 || Mount Lemmon || Mount Lemmon Survey || — || align=right | 3.0 km || 
|-id=098 bgcolor=#d6d6d6
| 455098 ||  || — || November 25, 2005 || Mount Lemmon || Mount Lemmon Survey || — || align=right | 3.4 km || 
|-id=099 bgcolor=#E9E9E9
| 455099 ||  || — || March 1, 2008 || Kitt Peak || Spacewatch || — || align=right | 2.4 km || 
|-id=100 bgcolor=#d6d6d6
| 455100 ||  || — || January 11, 2011 || Catalina || CSS || — || align=right | 2.9 km || 
|}

455101–455200 

|-bgcolor=#fefefe
| 455101 ||  || — || October 7, 2004 || Kitt Peak || Spacewatch || — || align=right data-sort-value="0.75" | 750 m || 
|-id=102 bgcolor=#fefefe
| 455102 ||  || — || November 30, 2005 || Kitt Peak || Spacewatch || — || align=right data-sort-value="0.70" | 700 m || 
|-id=103 bgcolor=#d6d6d6
| 455103 ||  || — || January 30, 2006 || Kitt Peak || Spacewatch || — || align=right | 3.9 km || 
|-id=104 bgcolor=#E9E9E9
| 455104 ||  || — || September 25, 2006 || Mount Lemmon || Mount Lemmon Survey || — || align=right | 1.4 km || 
|-id=105 bgcolor=#E9E9E9
| 455105 ||  || — || July 21, 2010 || WISE || WISE || — || align=right | 1.1 km || 
|-id=106 bgcolor=#fefefe
| 455106 ||  || — || October 13, 2004 || Kitt Peak || Spacewatch || — || align=right data-sort-value="0.78" | 780 m || 
|-id=107 bgcolor=#fefefe
| 455107 ||  || — || October 3, 1991 || Kitt Peak || Spacewatch || H || align=right data-sort-value="0.46" | 460 m || 
|-id=108 bgcolor=#fefefe
| 455108 ||  || — || October 22, 2005 || Kitt Peak || Spacewatch || — || align=right data-sort-value="0.70" | 700 m || 
|-id=109 bgcolor=#d6d6d6
| 455109 ||  || — || December 10, 2004 || Kitt Peak || Spacewatch || — || align=right | 4.2 km || 
|-id=110 bgcolor=#E9E9E9
| 455110 ||  || — || October 9, 2007 || Catalina || CSS || — || align=right | 3.1 km || 
|-id=111 bgcolor=#d6d6d6
| 455111 ||  || — || October 7, 2004 || Anderson Mesa || LONEOS || — || align=right | 3.4 km || 
|-id=112 bgcolor=#fefefe
| 455112 ||  || — || May 6, 2008 || Mount Lemmon || Mount Lemmon Survey || — || align=right data-sort-value="0.81" | 810 m || 
|-id=113 bgcolor=#d6d6d6
| 455113 ||  || — || December 1, 2005 || Kitt Peak || Spacewatch || — || align=right | 2.7 km || 
|-id=114 bgcolor=#fefefe
| 455114 ||  || — || April 13, 2004 || Kitt Peak || Spacewatch || — || align=right data-sort-value="0.83" | 830 m || 
|-id=115 bgcolor=#fefefe
| 455115 ||  || — || November 11, 2004 || Kitt Peak || Spacewatch || NYS || align=right data-sort-value="0.58" | 580 m || 
|-id=116 bgcolor=#E9E9E9
| 455116 ||  || — || November 30, 2011 || Catalina || CSS || — || align=right | 1.2 km || 
|-id=117 bgcolor=#d6d6d6
| 455117 ||  || — || October 7, 2004 || Kitt Peak || Spacewatch || — || align=right | 3.4 km || 
|-id=118 bgcolor=#d6d6d6
| 455118 ||  || — || September 20, 2003 || Kitt Peak || Spacewatch || — || align=right | 3.3 km || 
|-id=119 bgcolor=#d6d6d6
| 455119 ||  || — || November 9, 2004 || Catalina || CSS || VER || align=right | 4.5 km || 
|-id=120 bgcolor=#fefefe
| 455120 ||  || — || October 12, 1993 || Kitt Peak || Spacewatch || — || align=right data-sort-value="0.57" | 570 m || 
|-id=121 bgcolor=#d6d6d6
| 455121 ||  || — || December 3, 1999 || Kitt Peak || Spacewatch || — || align=right | 4.3 km || 
|-id=122 bgcolor=#d6d6d6
| 455122 ||  || — || July 29, 2009 || Kitt Peak || Spacewatch || — || align=right | 2.6 km || 
|-id=123 bgcolor=#fefefe
| 455123 ||  || — || January 14, 2010 || WISE || WISE || — || align=right | 2.7 km || 
|-id=124 bgcolor=#E9E9E9
| 455124 ||  || — || May 30, 2006 || Kitt Peak || Spacewatch || — || align=right | 1.5 km || 
|-id=125 bgcolor=#E9E9E9
| 455125 ||  || — || December 4, 2007 || Kitt Peak || Spacewatch || — || align=right | 1.6 km || 
|-id=126 bgcolor=#d6d6d6
| 455126 ||  || — || September 17, 2003 || Kitt Peak || Spacewatch || — || align=right | 2.6 km || 
|-id=127 bgcolor=#FA8072
| 455127 ||  || — || December 30, 2000 || Socorro || LINEAR || — || align=right data-sort-value="0.61" | 610 m || 
|-id=128 bgcolor=#E9E9E9
| 455128 ||  || — || August 23, 1998 || Kitt Peak || Spacewatch || — || align=right | 1.1 km || 
|-id=129 bgcolor=#E9E9E9
| 455129 ||  || — || September 19, 2001 || Socorro || LINEAR || — || align=right | 1.7 km || 
|-id=130 bgcolor=#fefefe
| 455130 ||  || — || October 26, 2008 || Mount Lemmon || Mount Lemmon Survey || — || align=right data-sort-value="0.81" | 810 m || 
|-id=131 bgcolor=#d6d6d6
| 455131 ||  || — || December 25, 2010 || Mount Lemmon || Mount Lemmon Survey || EOS || align=right | 2.3 km || 
|-id=132 bgcolor=#d6d6d6
| 455132 ||  || — || October 8, 2004 || Socorro || LINEAR || — || align=right | 3.6 km || 
|-id=133 bgcolor=#fefefe
| 455133 ||  || — || March 31, 2003 || Kitt Peak || Spacewatch || — || align=right data-sort-value="0.86" | 860 m || 
|-id=134 bgcolor=#fefefe
| 455134 ||  || — || December 30, 2008 || Mount Lemmon || Mount Lemmon Survey || — || align=right data-sort-value="0.78" | 780 m || 
|-id=135 bgcolor=#E9E9E9
| 455135 ||  || — || September 26, 2006 || Kitt Peak || Spacewatch || — || align=right | 1.3 km || 
|-id=136 bgcolor=#E9E9E9
| 455136 ||  || — || February 9, 2008 || Mount Lemmon || Mount Lemmon Survey || — || align=right | 2.3 km || 
|-id=137 bgcolor=#fefefe
| 455137 ||  || — || April 22, 2011 || Kitt Peak || Spacewatch || — || align=right data-sort-value="0.77" | 770 m || 
|-id=138 bgcolor=#d6d6d6
| 455138 ||  || — || October 17, 2009 || Mount Lemmon || Mount Lemmon Survey || — || align=right | 3.4 km || 
|-id=139 bgcolor=#d6d6d6
| 455139 ||  || — || March 27, 2008 || Mount Lemmon || Mount Lemmon Survey || — || align=right | 3.4 km || 
|-id=140 bgcolor=#d6d6d6
| 455140 ||  || — || September 11, 2004 || Socorro || LINEAR || — || align=right | 3.4 km || 
|-id=141 bgcolor=#E9E9E9
| 455141 ||  || — || November 17, 2011 || Mount Lemmon || Mount Lemmon Survey || — || align=right | 1.1 km || 
|-id=142 bgcolor=#d6d6d6
| 455142 ||  || — || December 10, 2004 || Socorro || LINEAR || — || align=right | 3.2 km || 
|-id=143 bgcolor=#d6d6d6
| 455143 ||  || — || October 25, 2005 || Kitt Peak || Spacewatch || — || align=right | 2.7 km || 
|-id=144 bgcolor=#d6d6d6
| 455144 ||  || — || September 9, 2004 || Socorro || LINEAR || — || align=right | 2.3 km || 
|-id=145 bgcolor=#fefefe
| 455145 ||  || — || August 30, 1983 || Palomar || J. Gibson || (2076) || align=right data-sort-value="0.71" | 710 m || 
|-id=146 bgcolor=#FFC2E0
| 455146 ||  || — || March 25, 1993 || Kitt Peak || Spacewatch || AMOcritical || align=right data-sort-value="0.43" | 430 m || 
|-id=147 bgcolor=#fefefe
| 455147 ||  || — || January 8, 1994 || Kitt Peak || Spacewatch || — || align=right data-sort-value="0.56" | 560 m || 
|-id=148 bgcolor=#FFC2E0
| 455148 ||  || — || October 28, 1994 || Kitt Peak || Spacewatch || APOPHA || align=right data-sort-value="0.21" | 210 m || 
|-id=149 bgcolor=#FA8072
| 455149 ||  || — || June 4, 1995 || Kitt Peak || Spacewatch || critical || align=right data-sort-value="0.23" | 230 m || 
|-id=150 bgcolor=#fefefe
| 455150 ||  || — || October 2, 1995 || Kitt Peak || Spacewatch || — || align=right data-sort-value="0.57" | 570 m || 
|-id=151 bgcolor=#fefefe
| 455151 ||  || — || October 23, 1995 || Kitt Peak || Spacewatch || — || align=right data-sort-value="0.49" | 490 m || 
|-id=152 bgcolor=#fefefe
| 455152 ||  || — || November 14, 1995 || Kitt Peak || Spacewatch || — || align=right data-sort-value="0.51" | 510 m || 
|-id=153 bgcolor=#fefefe
| 455153 ||  || — || December 20, 1995 || Kitt Peak || Spacewatch || — || align=right data-sort-value="0.66" | 660 m || 
|-id=154 bgcolor=#fefefe
| 455154 ||  || — || September 8, 1996 || Kitt Peak || Spacewatch || — || align=right data-sort-value="0.79" | 790 m || 
|-id=155 bgcolor=#fefefe
| 455155 ||  || — || October 11, 1996 || Kitt Peak || Spacewatch || — || align=right | 1.1 km || 
|-id=156 bgcolor=#d6d6d6
| 455156 ||  || — || November 3, 1996 || Kitt Peak || Spacewatch || — || align=right | 3.7 km || 
|-id=157 bgcolor=#FFC2E0
| 455157 ||  || — || December 20, 1997 || Xinglong || SCAP || AMO +1km || align=right | 1.3 km || 
|-id=158 bgcolor=#fefefe
| 455158 ||  || — || May 29, 1998 || Kitt Peak || Spacewatch || — || align=right data-sort-value="0.86" | 860 m || 
|-id=159 bgcolor=#E9E9E9
| 455159 ||  || — || June 21, 1998 || Kitt Peak || Spacewatch || — || align=right | 1.3 km || 
|-id=160 bgcolor=#d6d6d6
| 455160 ||  || — || August 23, 1998 || Xinglong || SCAP || — || align=right | 2.5 km || 
|-id=161 bgcolor=#E9E9E9
| 455161 ||  || — || September 14, 1998 || Socorro || LINEAR || — || align=right | 1.4 km || 
|-id=162 bgcolor=#d6d6d6
| 455162 ||  || — || September 20, 1998 || Catalina || CSS || — || align=right | 2.9 km || 
|-id=163 bgcolor=#E9E9E9
| 455163 ||  || — || September 20, 1998 || Kitt Peak || Spacewatch || — || align=right data-sort-value="0.91" | 910 m || 
|-id=164 bgcolor=#d6d6d6
| 455164 || 1998 TN || — || October 10, 1998 || Goodricke-Pigott || R. A. Tucker || — || align=right | 1.9 km || 
|-id=165 bgcolor=#FA8072
| 455165 ||  || — || January 14, 1999 || Catalina || CSS || — || align=right | 1.7 km || 
|-id=166 bgcolor=#E9E9E9
| 455166 ||  || — || January 9, 1999 || Kitt Peak || Spacewatch || — || align=right | 1.4 km || 
|-id=167 bgcolor=#d6d6d6
| 455167 ||  || — || January 18, 1999 || Kitt Peak || Spacewatch || — || align=right | 3.4 km || 
|-id=168 bgcolor=#E9E9E9
| 455168 ||  || — || May 12, 1999 || Socorro || LINEAR || — || align=right | 2.6 km || 
|-id=169 bgcolor=#FA8072
| 455169 ||  || — || May 23, 1999 || Anderson Mesa || LONEOS || — || align=right | 1.7 km || 
|-id=170 bgcolor=#FA8072
| 455170 ||  || — || July 14, 1999 || Socorro || LINEAR || — || align=right data-sort-value="0.71" | 710 m || 
|-id=171 bgcolor=#C2E0FF
| 455171 ||  || — || July 19, 1999 || Mauna Kea || Mauna Kea Obs. || cubewano (cold)critical || align=right | 168 km || 
|-id=172 bgcolor=#FA8072
| 455172 ||  || — || August 17, 1999 || Siding Spring || R. H. McNaught || — || align=right | 2.3 km || 
|-id=173 bgcolor=#fefefe
| 455173 ||  || — || October 6, 1999 || Socorro || LINEAR || — || align=right data-sort-value="0.55" | 550 m || 
|-id=174 bgcolor=#FA8072
| 455174 ||  || — || October 14, 1999 || Socorro || LINEAR || — || align=right | 1.9 km || 
|-id=175 bgcolor=#fefefe
| 455175 ||  || — || October 30, 1999 || Kitt Peak || Spacewatch || — || align=right data-sort-value="0.84" | 840 m || 
|-id=176 bgcolor=#FFC2E0
| 455176 ||  || — || November 10, 1999 || Catalina || CSS || APOPHA || align=right data-sort-value="0.26" | 260 m || 
|-id=177 bgcolor=#d6d6d6
| 455177 ||  || — || November 4, 1999 || Kitt Peak || Spacewatch || — || align=right | 1.8 km || 
|-id=178 bgcolor=#fefefe
| 455178 ||  || — || November 15, 1999 || Kitt Peak || Spacewatch || — || align=right data-sort-value="0.67" | 670 m || 
|-id=179 bgcolor=#d6d6d6
| 455179 ||  || — || January 8, 2000 || Kitt Peak || Spacewatch || — || align=right | 3.0 km || 
|-id=180 bgcolor=#fefefe
| 455180 ||  || — || January 28, 2000 || Kitt Peak || Spacewatch || H || align=right data-sort-value="0.74" | 740 m || 
|-id=181 bgcolor=#E9E9E9
| 455181 ||  || — || February 27, 2000 || Kitt Peak || Spacewatch || — || align=right data-sort-value="0.98" | 980 m || 
|-id=182 bgcolor=#d6d6d6
| 455182 ||  || — || February 28, 2000 || Socorro || LINEAR || — || align=right | 2.5 km || 
|-id=183 bgcolor=#d6d6d6
| 455183 ||  || — || February 28, 2000 || Kitt Peak || Spacewatch || — || align=right | 2.5 km || 
|-id=184 bgcolor=#FFC2E0
| 455184 ||  || — || March 4, 2000 || Socorro || LINEAR || ATEPHAcritical || align=right data-sort-value="0.25" | 250 m || 
|-id=185 bgcolor=#FFC2E0
| 455185 ||  || — || March 12, 2000 || Socorro || LINEAR || AMO +1km || align=right data-sort-value="0.6" | 600 m || 
|-id=186 bgcolor=#fefefe
| 455186 ||  || — || March 10, 2000 || Kitt Peak || Spacewatch || H || align=right data-sort-value="0.73" | 730 m || 
|-id=187 bgcolor=#d6d6d6
| 455187 ||  || — || April 5, 2000 || Socorro || LINEAR || — || align=right | 4.2 km || 
|-id=188 bgcolor=#E9E9E9
| 455188 ||  || — || July 5, 2000 || Kitt Peak || Spacewatch || — || align=right | 2.4 km || 
|-id=189 bgcolor=#FA8072
| 455189 ||  || — || August 25, 2000 || Socorro || LINEAR || — || align=right | 1.2 km || 
|-id=190 bgcolor=#FA8072
| 455190 ||  || — || August 26, 2000 || Socorro || LINEAR || — || align=right | 1.3 km || 
|-id=191 bgcolor=#fefefe
| 455191 ||  || — || August 24, 2000 || Socorro || LINEAR || ERI || align=right | 1.4 km || 
|-id=192 bgcolor=#FFC2E0
| 455192 ||  || — || August 31, 2000 || Socorro || LINEAR || AMO +1km || align=right | 1.1 km || 
|-id=193 bgcolor=#FFC2E0
| 455193 ||  || — || September 6, 2000 || Socorro || LINEAR || AMO || align=right data-sort-value="0.74" | 740 m || 
|-id=194 bgcolor=#E9E9E9
| 455194 ||  || — || September 3, 2000 || Socorro || LINEAR || — || align=right | 2.2 km || 
|-id=195 bgcolor=#FA8072
| 455195 ||  || — || September 28, 2000 || Socorro || LINEAR || — || align=right | 1.5 km || 
|-id=196 bgcolor=#fefefe
| 455196 ||  || — || September 23, 2000 || Anderson Mesa || LONEOS || ERI || align=right | 1.8 km || 
|-id=197 bgcolor=#d6d6d6
| 455197 ||  || — || October 1, 2000 || Socorro || LINEAR || — || align=right | 1.9 km || 
|-id=198 bgcolor=#fefefe
| 455198 ||  || — || October 2, 2000 || Socorro || LINEAR || — || align=right data-sort-value="0.90" | 900 m || 
|-id=199 bgcolor=#FFC2E0
| 455199 ||  || — || December 19, 2000 || Socorro || LINEAR || AMOcritical || align=right data-sort-value="0.39" | 390 m || 
|-id=200 bgcolor=#fefefe
| 455200 ||  || — || January 20, 2001 || Kitt Peak || Spacewatch || NYS || align=right data-sort-value="0.52" | 520 m || 
|}

455201–455300 

|-bgcolor=#fefefe
| 455201 ||  || — || February 2, 2001 || Prescott || P. G. Comba || H || align=right data-sort-value="0.66" | 660 m || 
|-id=202 bgcolor=#fefefe
| 455202 ||  || — || February 19, 2001 || Socorro || LINEAR || — || align=right data-sort-value="0.92" | 920 m || 
|-id=203 bgcolor=#fefefe
| 455203 ||  || — || February 21, 2001 || Nogales || Tenagra II Obs. || — || align=right data-sort-value="0.65" | 650 m || 
|-id=204 bgcolor=#FA8072
| 455204 ||  || — || March 20, 2001 || Haleakala || NEAT || — || align=right data-sort-value="0.83" | 830 m || 
|-id=205 bgcolor=#fefefe
| 455205 ||  || — || March 18, 2001 || Socorro || LINEAR || H || align=right data-sort-value="0.68" | 680 m || 
|-id=206 bgcolor=#C2E0FF
| 455206 ||  || — || March 27, 2001 || Kitt Peak || R. L. Allen, G. Bernstein, R. Malhotra || cubewano (cold) || align=right | 193 km || 
|-id=207 bgcolor=#d6d6d6
| 455207 Kellyyoder ||  ||  || March 21, 2001 || Kitt Peak || SKADS || EOS || align=right | 1.6 km || 
|-id=208 bgcolor=#E9E9E9
| 455208 ||  || — || March 21, 2001 || Kitt Peak || SKADS || — || align=right data-sort-value="0.62" | 620 m || 
|-id=209 bgcolor=#C2E0FF
| 455209 ||  || — || May 24, 2001 || Cerro Tololo || M. W. Buie || cubewano (cold)critical || align=right | 168 km || 
|-id=210 bgcolor=#fefefe
| 455210 ||  || — || June 27, 2001 || Kitt Peak || Spacewatch || — || align=right data-sort-value="0.77" | 770 m || 
|-id=211 bgcolor=#FA8072
| 455211 ||  || — || June 28, 2001 || Haleakala || NEAT || — || align=right data-sort-value="0.80" | 800 m || 
|-id=212 bgcolor=#d6d6d6
| 455212 ||  || — || July 21, 2001 || Haleakala || NEAT || — || align=right | 3.8 km || 
|-id=213 bgcolor=#FFC2E0
| 455213 ||  || — || July 27, 2001 || Palomar || NEAT || AMO +1kmfast || align=right data-sort-value="0.93" | 930 m || 
|-id=214 bgcolor=#E9E9E9
| 455214 ||  || — || August 9, 2001 || Palomar || NEAT || — || align=right | 1.2 km || 
|-id=215 bgcolor=#FA8072
| 455215 ||  || — || August 11, 2001 || Palomar || NEAT || — || align=right | 2.3 km || 
|-id=216 bgcolor=#E9E9E9
| 455216 ||  || — || July 27, 2001 || Anderson Mesa || LONEOS || EUN || align=right | 1.4 km || 
|-id=217 bgcolor=#FA8072
| 455217 ||  || — || August 28, 2001 || Ondřejov || M. Wolf, L. Kotková || — || align=right data-sort-value="0.84" | 840 m || 
|-id=218 bgcolor=#fefefe
| 455218 ||  || — || August 22, 2001 || Haleakala || NEAT || — || align=right data-sort-value="0.85" | 850 m || 
|-id=219 bgcolor=#E9E9E9
| 455219 ||  || — || August 24, 2001 || Anderson Mesa || LONEOS || — || align=right | 1.7 km || 
|-id=220 bgcolor=#fefefe
| 455220 ||  || — || August 19, 2001 || Socorro || LINEAR || H || align=right data-sort-value="0.98" | 980 m || 
|-id=221 bgcolor=#d6d6d6
| 455221 ||  || — || August 27, 2001 || Palomar || S. F. Hönig || LIX || align=right | 4.0 km || 
|-id=222 bgcolor=#FA8072
| 455222 ||  || — || September 7, 2001 || Socorro || LINEAR || — || align=right data-sort-value="0.57" | 570 m || 
|-id=223 bgcolor=#E9E9E9
| 455223 ||  || — || September 7, 2001 || Socorro || LINEAR || — || align=right | 1.6 km || 
|-id=224 bgcolor=#FA8072
| 455224 ||  || — || September 14, 2001 || Palomar || NEAT || — || align=right data-sort-value="0.94" | 940 m || 
|-id=225 bgcolor=#fefefe
| 455225 ||  || — || September 12, 2001 || Socorro || LINEAR || — || align=right data-sort-value="0.59" | 590 m || 
|-id=226 bgcolor=#E9E9E9
| 455226 ||  || — || September 11, 2001 || Kitt Peak || Spacewatch || — || align=right | 1.7 km || 
|-id=227 bgcolor=#E9E9E9
| 455227 ||  || — || September 10, 2001 || Socorro || LINEAR || EUN || align=right | 1.5 km || 
|-id=228 bgcolor=#fefefe
| 455228 ||  || — || August 25, 2001 || Kitt Peak || Spacewatch || — || align=right data-sort-value="0.62" | 620 m || 
|-id=229 bgcolor=#E9E9E9
| 455229 ||  || — || September 16, 2001 || Socorro || LINEAR || — || align=right | 1.5 km || 
|-id=230 bgcolor=#fefefe
| 455230 ||  || — || August 27, 2001 || Anderson Mesa || LONEOS || — || align=right data-sort-value="0.69" | 690 m || 
|-id=231 bgcolor=#FA8072
| 455231 ||  || — || September 20, 2001 || Socorro || LINEAR || — || align=right data-sort-value="0.91" | 910 m || 
|-id=232 bgcolor=#fefefe
| 455232 ||  || — || September 16, 2001 || Socorro || LINEAR || — || align=right data-sort-value="0.86" | 860 m || 
|-id=233 bgcolor=#fefefe
| 455233 ||  || — || September 16, 2001 || Socorro || LINEAR || — || align=right data-sort-value="0.62" | 620 m || 
|-id=234 bgcolor=#fefefe
| 455234 ||  || — || September 16, 2001 || Socorro || LINEAR || — || align=right data-sort-value="0.59" | 590 m || 
|-id=235 bgcolor=#fefefe
| 455235 ||  || — || September 16, 2001 || Socorro || LINEAR || — || align=right data-sort-value="0.67" | 670 m || 
|-id=236 bgcolor=#FA8072
| 455236 ||  || — || September 17, 2001 || Socorro || LINEAR || — || align=right data-sort-value="0.86" | 860 m || 
|-id=237 bgcolor=#E9E9E9
| 455237 ||  || — || September 7, 2001 || Socorro || LINEAR || — || align=right | 1.8 km || 
|-id=238 bgcolor=#d6d6d6
| 455238 ||  || — || September 19, 2001 || Socorro || LINEAR || — || align=right | 4.3 km || 
|-id=239 bgcolor=#fefefe
| 455239 ||  || — || September 19, 2001 || Socorro || LINEAR || — || align=right data-sort-value="0.60" | 600 m || 
|-id=240 bgcolor=#fefefe
| 455240 ||  || — || September 11, 2001 || Anderson Mesa || LONEOS || — || align=right data-sort-value="0.79" | 790 m || 
|-id=241 bgcolor=#E9E9E9
| 455241 ||  || — || September 19, 2001 || Socorro || LINEAR || — || align=right | 2.0 km || 
|-id=242 bgcolor=#E9E9E9
| 455242 ||  || — || September 19, 2001 || Socorro || LINEAR || — || align=right | 1.5 km || 
|-id=243 bgcolor=#d6d6d6
| 455243 ||  || — || September 11, 2001 || Kitt Peak || Spacewatch || 7:4 || align=right | 4.0 km || 
|-id=244 bgcolor=#fefefe
| 455244 ||  || — || September 19, 2001 || Socorro || LINEAR || H || align=right data-sort-value="0.85" | 850 m || 
|-id=245 bgcolor=#E9E9E9
| 455245 ||  || — || September 19, 2001 || Socorro || LINEAR || — || align=right | 1.3 km || 
|-id=246 bgcolor=#E9E9E9
| 455246 ||  || — || September 20, 2001 || Kitt Peak || Spacewatch || — || align=right | 2.0 km || 
|-id=247 bgcolor=#E9E9E9
| 455247 ||  || — || August 16, 2001 || Socorro || LINEAR || — || align=right | 2.0 km || 
|-id=248 bgcolor=#E9E9E9
| 455248 ||  || — || September 17, 2001 || Palomar || NEAT || — || align=right | 1.7 km || 
|-id=249 bgcolor=#E9E9E9
| 455249 ||  || — || September 22, 2001 || Palomar || NEAT || — || align=right | 1.1 km || 
|-id=250 bgcolor=#E9E9E9
| 455250 ||  || — || October 9, 2001 || Socorro || LINEAR || — || align=right | 2.8 km || 
|-id=251 bgcolor=#fefefe
| 455251 ||  || — || October 14, 2001 || Socorro || LINEAR || — || align=right data-sort-value="0.71" | 710 m || 
|-id=252 bgcolor=#E9E9E9
| 455252 ||  || — || September 11, 2001 || Socorro || LINEAR || — || align=right | 1.5 km || 
|-id=253 bgcolor=#fefefe
| 455253 ||  || — || October 14, 2001 || Socorro || LINEAR || H || align=right data-sort-value="0.76" | 760 m || 
|-id=254 bgcolor=#E9E9E9
| 455254 ||  || — || October 11, 2001 || Socorro || LINEAR || JUN || align=right | 1.3 km || 
|-id=255 bgcolor=#fefefe
| 455255 ||  || — || October 15, 2001 || Kitt Peak || Spacewatch || — || align=right data-sort-value="0.65" | 650 m || 
|-id=256 bgcolor=#E9E9E9
| 455256 ||  || — || October 15, 2001 || Socorro || LINEAR || — || align=right | 1.0 km || 
|-id=257 bgcolor=#E9E9E9
| 455257 ||  || — || October 14, 2001 || Socorro || LINEAR || AEO || align=right data-sort-value="0.87" | 870 m || 
|-id=258 bgcolor=#fefefe
| 455258 ||  || — || October 14, 2001 || Socorro || LINEAR || (2076) || align=right data-sort-value="0.80" | 800 m || 
|-id=259 bgcolor=#E9E9E9
| 455259 ||  || — || October 13, 2001 || Kitt Peak || Spacewatch || — || align=right | 1.8 km || 
|-id=260 bgcolor=#E9E9E9
| 455260 ||  || — || October 23, 2001 || Socorro || LINEAR || — || align=right | 2.1 km || 
|-id=261 bgcolor=#fefefe
| 455261 ||  || — || October 23, 2001 || Palomar || NEAT || — || align=right data-sort-value="0.74" | 740 m || 
|-id=262 bgcolor=#FA8072
| 455262 ||  || — || October 16, 2001 || Socorro || LINEAR || H || align=right data-sort-value="0.81" | 810 m || 
|-id=263 bgcolor=#FA8072
| 455263 ||  || — || October 23, 2001 || Socorro || LINEAR || — || align=right data-sort-value="0.82" | 820 m || 
|-id=264 bgcolor=#E9E9E9
| 455264 ||  || — || October 16, 2001 || Palomar || NEAT || — || align=right | 1.5 km || 
|-id=265 bgcolor=#FA8072
| 455265 ||  || — || November 10, 2001 || Socorro || LINEAR || — || align=right | 1.0 km || 
|-id=266 bgcolor=#E9E9E9
| 455266 ||  || — || November 9, 2001 || Socorro || LINEAR || — || align=right | 2.0 km || 
|-id=267 bgcolor=#fefefe
| 455267 ||  || — || October 24, 2001 || Socorro || LINEAR || — || align=right data-sort-value="0.66" | 660 m || 
|-id=268 bgcolor=#fefefe
| 455268 ||  || — || November 10, 2001 || Socorro || LINEAR || — || align=right data-sort-value="0.87" | 870 m || 
|-id=269 bgcolor=#E9E9E9
| 455269 ||  || — || October 21, 2001 || Socorro || LINEAR || EUN || align=right | 1.3 km || 
|-id=270 bgcolor=#E9E9E9
| 455270 ||  || — || November 17, 2001 || Kitt Peak || Spacewatch || — || align=right | 1.5 km || 
|-id=271 bgcolor=#E9E9E9
| 455271 ||  || — || December 11, 2001 || Socorro || LINEAR || — || align=right | 3.9 km || 
|-id=272 bgcolor=#E9E9E9
| 455272 ||  || — || November 20, 2001 || Socorro || LINEAR || — || align=right | 2.5 km || 
|-id=273 bgcolor=#E9E9E9
| 455273 ||  || — || December 14, 2001 || Socorro || LINEAR || — || align=right | 2.0 km || 
|-id=274 bgcolor=#E9E9E9
| 455274 ||  || — || December 14, 2001 || Socorro || LINEAR || EUN || align=right | 1.5 km || 
|-id=275 bgcolor=#E9E9E9
| 455275 ||  || — || December 14, 2001 || Socorro || LINEAR || — || align=right | 2.2 km || 
|-id=276 bgcolor=#fefefe
| 455276 ||  || — || November 20, 2001 || Socorro || LINEAR || — || align=right data-sort-value="0.80" | 800 m || 
|-id=277 bgcolor=#fefefe
| 455277 ||  || — || December 15, 2001 || Socorro || LINEAR || — || align=right data-sort-value="0.74" | 740 m || 
|-id=278 bgcolor=#fefefe
| 455278 ||  || — || December 17, 2001 || Socorro || LINEAR || H || align=right data-sort-value="0.90" | 900 m || 
|-id=279 bgcolor=#E9E9E9
| 455279 ||  || — || November 9, 2001 || Socorro || LINEAR || — || align=right | 2.1 km || 
|-id=280 bgcolor=#E9E9E9
| 455280 ||  || — || December 14, 2001 || Kitt Peak || Spacewatch || — || align=right | 2.0 km || 
|-id=281 bgcolor=#E9E9E9
| 455281 ||  || — || December 18, 2001 || Socorro || LINEAR || — || align=right | 2.2 km || 
|-id=282 bgcolor=#fefefe
| 455282 ||  || — || December 18, 2001 || Apache Point || SDSS || V || align=right data-sort-value="0.55" | 550 m || 
|-id=283 bgcolor=#fefefe
| 455283 ||  || — || December 18, 2001 || Socorro || LINEAR || — || align=right | 1.0 km || 
|-id=284 bgcolor=#fefefe
| 455284 ||  || — || January 9, 2002 || Socorro || LINEAR || — || align=right | 1.0 km || 
|-id=285 bgcolor=#fefefe
| 455285 ||  || — || January 9, 2002 || Socorro || LINEAR || — || align=right data-sort-value="0.76" | 760 m || 
|-id=286 bgcolor=#fefefe
| 455286 ||  || — || February 10, 2002 || Socorro || LINEAR || H || align=right data-sort-value="0.76" | 760 m || 
|-id=287 bgcolor=#E9E9E9
| 455287 ||  || — || January 19, 2002 || Kitt Peak || Spacewatch || GEF || align=right | 1.1 km || 
|-id=288 bgcolor=#fefefe
| 455288 ||  || — || February 10, 2002 || Socorro || LINEAR || — || align=right data-sort-value="0.73" | 730 m || 
|-id=289 bgcolor=#fefefe
| 455289 ||  || — || February 14, 2002 || Desert Eagle || W. K. Y. Yeung || — || align=right | 1.2 km || 
|-id=290 bgcolor=#E9E9E9
| 455290 ||  || — || February 11, 2002 || Socorro || LINEAR || — || align=right | 2.1 km || 
|-id=291 bgcolor=#fefefe
| 455291 ||  || — || February 8, 2002 || Socorro || LINEAR || — || align=right data-sort-value="0.95" | 950 m || 
|-id=292 bgcolor=#E9E9E9
| 455292 ||  || — || February 10, 2002 || Socorro || LINEAR || — || align=right | 2.2 km || 
|-id=293 bgcolor=#E9E9E9
| 455293 ||  || — || February 11, 2002 || Socorro || LINEAR || — || align=right | 2.5 km || 
|-id=294 bgcolor=#fefefe
| 455294 ||  || — || February 6, 2002 || Kitt Peak || M. W. Buie || — || align=right data-sort-value="0.84" | 840 m || 
|-id=295 bgcolor=#fefefe
| 455295 ||  || — || February 7, 2002 || Kitt Peak || Spacewatch || NYS || align=right data-sort-value="0.44" | 440 m || 
|-id=296 bgcolor=#fefefe
| 455296 ||  || — || February 10, 2002 || Socorro || LINEAR || — || align=right data-sort-value="0.77" | 770 m || 
|-id=297 bgcolor=#fefefe
| 455297 || 2002 DK || — || February 16, 2002 || Bohyunsan || Y.-B. Jeon, B.-C. Lee || — || align=right data-sort-value="0.70" | 700 m || 
|-id=298 bgcolor=#E9E9E9
| 455298 ||  || — || February 20, 2002 || Kitt Peak || Spacewatch || DOR || align=right | 2.1 km || 
|-id=299 bgcolor=#FFC2E0
| 455299 ||  || — || March 10, 2002 || Drebach || A. Knöfel || APO +1kmPHAcritical || align=right data-sort-value="0.54" | 540 m || 
|-id=300 bgcolor=#fefefe
| 455300 ||  || — || March 14, 2002 || Socorro || LINEAR || — || align=right data-sort-value="0.81" | 810 m || 
|}

455301–455400 

|-bgcolor=#fefefe
| 455301 ||  || — || March 9, 2002 || Palomar || NEAT || — || align=right data-sort-value="0.65" | 650 m || 
|-id=302 bgcolor=#fefefe
| 455302 ||  || — || March 12, 2002 || Palomar || NEAT || — || align=right data-sort-value="0.53" | 530 m || 
|-id=303 bgcolor=#fefefe
| 455303 ||  || — || March 9, 2002 || Socorro || LINEAR || — || align=right data-sort-value="0.84" | 840 m || 
|-id=304 bgcolor=#fefefe
| 455304 ||  || — || March 13, 2002 || Socorro || LINEAR || — || align=right data-sort-value="0.65" | 650 m || 
|-id=305 bgcolor=#E9E9E9
| 455305 ||  || — || March 9, 2002 || Anderson Mesa || LONEOS || — || align=right | 2.9 km || 
|-id=306 bgcolor=#E9E9E9
| 455306 ||  || — || January 13, 2002 || Kitt Peak || Spacewatch || — || align=right | 2.1 km || 
|-id=307 bgcolor=#fefefe
| 455307 ||  || — || March 12, 2002 || Palomar || NEAT || — || align=right data-sort-value="0.76" | 760 m || 
|-id=308 bgcolor=#FA8072
| 455308 ||  || — || March 16, 2002 || Haleakala || NEAT || — || align=right data-sort-value="0.85" | 850 m || 
|-id=309 bgcolor=#fefefe
| 455309 ||  || — || March 20, 2002 || Kitt Peak || Spacewatch || — || align=right data-sort-value="0.64" | 640 m || 
|-id=310 bgcolor=#fefefe
| 455310 ||  || — || April 4, 2002 || Palomar || NEAT || — || align=right data-sort-value="0.86" | 860 m || 
|-id=311 bgcolor=#FA8072
| 455311 ||  || — || April 9, 2002 || Socorro || LINEAR || — || align=right data-sort-value="0.56" | 560 m || 
|-id=312 bgcolor=#fefefe
| 455312 ||  || — || April 2, 2002 || Kitt Peak || Spacewatch || — || align=right data-sort-value="0.69" | 690 m || 
|-id=313 bgcolor=#fefefe
| 455313 ||  || — || April 11, 2002 || Socorro || LINEAR || — || align=right data-sort-value="0.77" | 770 m || 
|-id=314 bgcolor=#fefefe
| 455314 ||  || — || April 10, 2002 || Socorro || LINEAR || — || align=right data-sort-value="0.70" | 700 m || 
|-id=315 bgcolor=#E9E9E9
| 455315 ||  || — || April 12, 2002 || Palomar || NEAT || — || align=right | 2.5 km || 
|-id=316 bgcolor=#d6d6d6
| 455316 ||  || — || April 12, 2002 || Palomar || NEAT || — || align=right | 2.3 km || 
|-id=317 bgcolor=#fefefe
| 455317 ||  || — || April 22, 2002 || Socorro || LINEAR || — || align=right | 1.1 km || 
|-id=318 bgcolor=#fefefe
| 455318 ||  || — || April 30, 2002 || Palomar || NEAT || — || align=right data-sort-value="0.81" | 810 m || 
|-id=319 bgcolor=#fefefe
| 455319 ||  || — || April 10, 2002 || Socorro || LINEAR || — || align=right data-sort-value="0.88" | 880 m || 
|-id=320 bgcolor=#d6d6d6
| 455320 ||  || — || May 16, 2002 || Socorro || LINEAR || Tj (2.95) || align=right | 3.5 km || 
|-id=321 bgcolor=#d6d6d6
| 455321 ||  || — || July 5, 2002 || Kitt Peak || Spacewatch || — || align=right | 2.7 km || 
|-id=322 bgcolor=#FFC2E0
| 455322 ||  || — || July 9, 2002 || Socorro || LINEAR || AMO +1km || align=right | 1.2 km || 
|-id=323 bgcolor=#d6d6d6
| 455323 ||  || — || July 13, 2002 || Haleakala || NEAT || — || align=right | 5.8 km || 
|-id=324 bgcolor=#d6d6d6
| 455324 ||  || — || July 9, 2002 || Socorro || LINEAR || — || align=right | 3.7 km || 
|-id=325 bgcolor=#d6d6d6
| 455325 ||  || — || July 29, 2002 || Palomar || S. F. Hönig || — || align=right | 3.0 km || 
|-id=326 bgcolor=#d6d6d6
| 455326 ||  || — || July 19, 2002 || Palomar || NEAT || — || align=right | 3.6 km || 
|-id=327 bgcolor=#FA8072
| 455327 ||  || — || July 21, 2002 || Palomar || NEAT || H || align=right data-sort-value="0.78" | 780 m || 
|-id=328 bgcolor=#d6d6d6
| 455328 ||  || — || July 20, 2002 || Palomar || NEAT || — || align=right | 2.8 km || 
|-id=329 bgcolor=#d6d6d6
| 455329 ||  || — || August 12, 2002 || Teide || Teide Obs. || Tj (2.97) || align=right | 5.0 km || 
|-id=330 bgcolor=#d6d6d6
| 455330 ||  || — || August 3, 2002 || Palomar || NEAT || — || align=right | 3.6 km || 
|-id=331 bgcolor=#E9E9E9
| 455331 ||  || — || August 13, 2002 || Socorro || LINEAR || — || align=right | 1.8 km || 
|-id=332 bgcolor=#fefefe
| 455332 ||  || — || August 8, 2002 || Palomar || NEAT || — || align=right data-sort-value="0.58" | 580 m || 
|-id=333 bgcolor=#d6d6d6
| 455333 ||  || — || August 18, 2002 || Palomar || NEAT || TIR || align=right | 3.1 km || 
|-id=334 bgcolor=#E9E9E9
| 455334 ||  || — || August 17, 2002 || Palomar || NEAT || (5) || align=right data-sort-value="0.67" | 670 m || 
|-id=335 bgcolor=#fefefe
| 455335 ||  || — || August 18, 2002 || Palomar || NEAT || — || align=right data-sort-value="0.55" | 550 m || 
|-id=336 bgcolor=#E9E9E9
| 455336 ||  || — || August 19, 2002 || Palomar || NEAT || (5) || align=right data-sort-value="0.70" | 700 m || 
|-id=337 bgcolor=#d6d6d6
| 455337 ||  || — || August 27, 2002 || Palomar || NEAT || — || align=right | 3.1 km || 
|-id=338 bgcolor=#d6d6d6
| 455338 ||  || — || August 16, 2002 || Palomar || NEAT || — || align=right | 3.3 km || 
|-id=339 bgcolor=#fefefe
| 455339 ||  || — || September 3, 2002 || Palomar || NEAT || — || align=right | 1.0 km || 
|-id=340 bgcolor=#d6d6d6
| 455340 ||  || — || September 1, 2002 || Haleakala || NEAT || EOS || align=right | 2.6 km || 
|-id=341 bgcolor=#E9E9E9
| 455341 ||  || — || September 4, 2002 || Anderson Mesa || LONEOS || — || align=right | 1.5 km || 
|-id=342 bgcolor=#fefefe
| 455342 ||  || — || September 4, 2002 || Anderson Mesa || LONEOS || — || align=right | 1.3 km || 
|-id=343 bgcolor=#E9E9E9
| 455343 ||  || — || September 5, 2002 || Anderson Mesa || LONEOS || critical || align=right data-sort-value="0.98" | 980 m || 
|-id=344 bgcolor=#E9E9E9
| 455344 ||  || — || September 5, 2002 || Socorro || LINEAR || — || align=right | 1.1 km || 
|-id=345 bgcolor=#E9E9E9
| 455345 ||  || — || September 5, 2002 || Socorro || LINEAR || — || align=right | 1.1 km || 
|-id=346 bgcolor=#E9E9E9
| 455346 ||  || — || September 5, 2002 || Socorro || LINEAR || — || align=right data-sort-value="0.86" | 860 m || 
|-id=347 bgcolor=#d6d6d6
| 455347 ||  || — || August 12, 2002 || Socorro || LINEAR || — || align=right | 3.8 km || 
|-id=348 bgcolor=#d6d6d6
| 455348 ||  || — || September 5, 2002 || Socorro || LINEAR || Tj (2.98) || align=right | 4.9 km || 
|-id=349 bgcolor=#E9E9E9
| 455349 ||  || — || September 5, 2002 || Campo Imperatore || CINEOS || — || align=right data-sort-value="0.86" | 860 m || 
|-id=350 bgcolor=#FA8072
| 455350 ||  || — || September 6, 2002 || Socorro || LINEAR || — || align=right data-sort-value="0.75" | 750 m || 
|-id=351 bgcolor=#d6d6d6
| 455351 ||  || — || September 11, 2002 || Palomar || NEAT || — || align=right | 3.1 km || 
|-id=352 bgcolor=#fefefe
| 455352 ||  || — || September 13, 2002 || Palomar || NEAT || — || align=right data-sort-value="0.65" | 650 m || 
|-id=353 bgcolor=#d6d6d6
| 455353 ||  || — || September 15, 2002 || Palomar || R. Matson || — || align=right | 3.9 km || 
|-id=354 bgcolor=#d6d6d6
| 455354 ||  || — || September 15, 2002 || Palomar || NEAT || — || align=right | 2.7 km || 
|-id=355 bgcolor=#d6d6d6
| 455355 ||  || — || September 3, 2002 || Palomar || NEAT || — || align=right | 3.4 km || 
|-id=356 bgcolor=#d6d6d6
| 455356 ||  || — || September 14, 2002 || Palomar || NEAT || — || align=right | 2.7 km || 
|-id=357 bgcolor=#d6d6d6
| 455357 ||  || — || September 13, 2002 || Palomar || NEAT || — || align=right | 2.4 km || 
|-id=358 bgcolor=#E9E9E9
| 455358 ||  || — || September 29, 2002 || Haleakala || NEAT || — || align=right | 1.2 km || 
|-id=359 bgcolor=#E9E9E9
| 455359 ||  || — || October 3, 2002 || Palomar || NEAT || — || align=right | 1.7 km || 
|-id=360 bgcolor=#E9E9E9
| 455360 ||  || — || October 4, 2002 || Socorro || LINEAR || (5) || align=right data-sort-value="0.77" | 770 m || 
|-id=361 bgcolor=#d6d6d6
| 455361 ||  || — || October 4, 2002 || Socorro || LINEAR || — || align=right | 2.3 km || 
|-id=362 bgcolor=#fefefe
| 455362 ||  || — || October 4, 2002 || Campo Imperatore || CINEOS || — || align=right data-sort-value="0.78" | 780 m || 
|-id=363 bgcolor=#E9E9E9
| 455363 ||  || — || October 3, 2002 || Palomar || NEAT || — || align=right | 1.1 km || 
|-id=364 bgcolor=#E9E9E9
| 455364 ||  || — || October 5, 2002 || Palomar || NEAT || — || align=right | 1.3 km || 
|-id=365 bgcolor=#d6d6d6
| 455365 ||  || — || October 5, 2002 || Palomar || NEAT || THB || align=right | 3.6 km || 
|-id=366 bgcolor=#d6d6d6
| 455366 ||  || — || October 3, 2002 || Palomar || NEAT || — || align=right | 4.0 km || 
|-id=367 bgcolor=#fefefe
| 455367 ||  || — || October 3, 2002 || Palomar || NEAT || — || align=right data-sort-value="0.76" | 760 m || 
|-id=368 bgcolor=#E9E9E9
| 455368 ||  || — || October 11, 2002 || Palomar || NEAT || — || align=right | 1.0 km || 
|-id=369 bgcolor=#E9E9E9
| 455369 ||  || — || October 8, 2002 || Needville || Needville Obs. || (5) || align=right data-sort-value="0.92" | 920 m || 
|-id=370 bgcolor=#E9E9E9
| 455370 ||  || — || October 4, 2002 || Socorro || LINEAR || (5) || align=right data-sort-value="0.70" | 700 m || 
|-id=371 bgcolor=#E9E9E9
| 455371 ||  || — || October 8, 2002 || Anderson Mesa || LONEOS || — || align=right data-sort-value="0.86" | 860 m || 
|-id=372 bgcolor=#E9E9E9
| 455372 ||  || — || October 10, 2002 || Socorro || LINEAR || — || align=right | 1.3 km || 
|-id=373 bgcolor=#E9E9E9
| 455373 ||  || — || October 4, 2002 || Apache Point || SDSS || — || align=right | 1.2 km || 
|-id=374 bgcolor=#E9E9E9
| 455374 ||  || — || October 5, 2002 || Apache Point || SDSS || — || align=right data-sort-value="0.86" | 860 m || 
|-id=375 bgcolor=#d6d6d6
| 455375 ||  || — || October 5, 2002 || Apache Point || SDSS || — || align=right | 3.8 km || 
|-id=376 bgcolor=#FA8072
| 455376 ||  || — || October 31, 2002 || Socorro || LINEAR || — || align=right | 1.0 km || 
|-id=377 bgcolor=#E9E9E9
| 455377 ||  || — || October 31, 2002 || Palomar || NEAT || — || align=right | 1.0 km || 
|-id=378 bgcolor=#E9E9E9
| 455378 ||  || — || October 31, 2002 || Socorro || LINEAR || — || align=right | 2.0 km || 
|-id=379 bgcolor=#E9E9E9
| 455379 ||  || — || October 30, 2002 || Kitt Peak || Spacewatch || — || align=right data-sort-value="0.75" | 750 m || 
|-id=380 bgcolor=#d6d6d6
| 455380 ||  || — || October 29, 2002 || Apache Point || SDSS || — || align=right | 2.9 km || 
|-id=381 bgcolor=#E9E9E9
| 455381 ||  || — || October 29, 2002 || Apache Point || SDSS || — || align=right | 1.1 km || 
|-id=382 bgcolor=#fefefe
| 455382 ||  || — || November 4, 2002 || Palomar || NEAT || H || align=right data-sort-value="0.87" | 870 m || 
|-id=383 bgcolor=#d6d6d6
| 455383 ||  || — || November 5, 2002 || Socorro || LINEAR || THB || align=right | 3.0 km || 
|-id=384 bgcolor=#E9E9E9
| 455384 ||  || — || November 5, 2002 || Palomar || NEAT || — || align=right data-sort-value="0.98" | 980 m || 
|-id=385 bgcolor=#E9E9E9
| 455385 ||  || — || November 9, 2002 || Eskridge || Farpoint Obs. || — || align=right | 1.5 km || 
|-id=386 bgcolor=#E9E9E9
| 455386 ||  || — || November 14, 2002 || Socorro || LINEAR || — || align=right | 1.2 km || 
|-id=387 bgcolor=#fefefe
| 455387 ||  || — || November 5, 2002 || Palomar || NEAT || — || align=right data-sort-value="0.54" | 540 m || 
|-id=388 bgcolor=#E9E9E9
| 455388 ||  || — || November 4, 2002 || Palomar || NEAT || — || align=right | 1.1 km || 
|-id=389 bgcolor=#E9E9E9
| 455389 ||  || — || November 6, 2002 || Anderson Mesa || LONEOS || BRG || align=right | 1.7 km || 
|-id=390 bgcolor=#FA8072
| 455390 ||  || — || November 17, 2002 || Socorro || LINEAR || — || align=right | 2.0 km || 
|-id=391 bgcolor=#fefefe
| 455391 ||  || — || November 24, 2002 || Palomar || NEAT || H || align=right data-sort-value="0.78" | 780 m || 
|-id=392 bgcolor=#E9E9E9
| 455392 ||  || — || December 2, 2002 || Socorro || LINEAR || — || align=right data-sort-value="0.98" | 980 m || 
|-id=393 bgcolor=#E9E9E9
| 455393 ||  || — || December 5, 2002 || Socorro || LINEAR || — || align=right | 1.5 km || 
|-id=394 bgcolor=#FA8072
| 455394 ||  || — || December 31, 2002 || Socorro || LINEAR || — || align=right | 2.1 km || 
|-id=395 bgcolor=#fefefe
| 455395 ||  || — || January 5, 2003 || Socorro || LINEAR || H || align=right data-sort-value="0.84" | 840 m || 
|-id=396 bgcolor=#FA8072
| 455396 ||  || — || January 5, 2003 || Socorro || LINEAR || — || align=right | 1.1 km || 
|-id=397 bgcolor=#E9E9E9
| 455397 ||  || — || January 5, 2003 || Socorro || LINEAR || — || align=right | 2.0 km || 
|-id=398 bgcolor=#FA8072
| 455398 ||  || — || January 11, 2003 || Socorro || LINEAR || — || align=right | 4.3 km || 
|-id=399 bgcolor=#E9E9E9
| 455399 ||  || — || January 26, 2003 || Palomar || NEAT || — || align=right | 2.5 km || 
|-id=400 bgcolor=#fefefe
| 455400 ||  || — || January 13, 2003 || Kitt Peak || Spacewatch || H || align=right data-sort-value="0.73" | 730 m || 
|}

455401–455500 

|-bgcolor=#fefefe
| 455401 ||  || — || December 31, 2002 || Socorro || LINEAR || H || align=right data-sort-value="0.85" | 850 m || 
|-id=402 bgcolor=#E9E9E9
| 455402 ||  || — || January 27, 2003 || Anderson Mesa || LONEOS || — || align=right | 2.5 km || 
|-id=403 bgcolor=#E9E9E9
| 455403 ||  || — || December 31, 2002 || Socorro || LINEAR || JUN || align=right | 1.1 km || 
|-id=404 bgcolor=#fefefe
| 455404 ||  || — || January 29, 2003 || Palomar || NEAT || H || align=right data-sort-value="0.64" | 640 m || 
|-id=405 bgcolor=#E9E9E9
| 455405 ||  || — || January 28, 2003 || Socorro || LINEAR || — || align=right | 2.1 km || 
|-id=406 bgcolor=#E9E9E9
| 455406 ||  || — || December 31, 2002 || Socorro || LINEAR || — || align=right | 1.8 km || 
|-id=407 bgcolor=#FFC2E0
| 455407 ||  || — || March 5, 2003 || Socorro || LINEAR || AMO || align=right data-sort-value="0.41" | 410 m || 
|-id=408 bgcolor=#fefefe
| 455408 ||  || — || March 3, 2003 || Haleakala || NEAT || H || align=right data-sort-value="0.87" | 870 m || 
|-id=409 bgcolor=#fefefe
| 455409 ||  || — || March 9, 2003 || Anderson Mesa || LONEOS || H || align=right data-sort-value="0.95" | 950 m || 
|-id=410 bgcolor=#E9E9E9
| 455410 ||  || — || March 26, 2003 || Haleakala || NEAT || — || align=right | 1.3 km || 
|-id=411 bgcolor=#fefefe
| 455411 ||  || — || March 26, 2003 || Socorro || LINEAR || H || align=right data-sort-value="0.93" | 930 m || 
|-id=412 bgcolor=#E9E9E9
| 455412 ||  || — || March 23, 2003 || Kitt Peak || Spacewatch || — || align=right | 2.0 km || 
|-id=413 bgcolor=#E9E9E9
| 455413 ||  || — || March 25, 2003 || Palomar || NEAT || — || align=right | 2.0 km || 
|-id=414 bgcolor=#E9E9E9
| 455414 ||  || — || March 29, 2003 || Anderson Mesa || LONEOS || ADE || align=right | 2.2 km || 
|-id=415 bgcolor=#FFC2E0
| 455415 ||  || — || April 1, 2003 || Socorro || LINEAR || AMO || align=right data-sort-value="0.20" | 200 m || 
|-id=416 bgcolor=#fefefe
| 455416 ||  || — || April 1, 2003 || Kitt Peak || Spacewatch || — || align=right data-sort-value="0.54" | 540 m || 
|-id=417 bgcolor=#C2FFFF
| 455417 ||  || — || July 28, 1995 || Kitt Peak || Spacewatch || L4 || align=right | 11 km || 
|-id=418 bgcolor=#fefefe
| 455418 ||  || — || April 10, 2003 || Kitt Peak || Spacewatch || H || align=right data-sort-value="0.70" | 700 m || 
|-id=419 bgcolor=#fefefe
| 455419 ||  || — || April 11, 2003 || Kitt Peak || Spacewatch || — || align=right data-sort-value="0.84" | 840 m || 
|-id=420 bgcolor=#fefefe
| 455420 ||  || — || April 23, 2003 || Socorro || LINEAR || H || align=right data-sort-value="0.89" | 890 m || 
|-id=421 bgcolor=#E9E9E9
| 455421 ||  || — || April 4, 2003 || Kitt Peak || Spacewatch || — || align=right | 2.1 km || 
|-id=422 bgcolor=#E9E9E9
| 455422 ||  || — || April 28, 2003 || Socorro || LINEAR || — || align=right | 2.5 km || 
|-id=423 bgcolor=#fefefe
| 455423 ||  || — || May 1, 2003 || Socorro || LINEAR || — || align=right | 1.0 km || 
|-id=424 bgcolor=#E9E9E9
| 455424 ||  || — || May 5, 2003 || Kitt Peak || Spacewatch || — || align=right | 2.4 km || 
|-id=425 bgcolor=#E9E9E9
| 455425 ||  || — || May 29, 2003 || Kitt Peak || Spacewatch || — || align=right | 1.8 km || 
|-id=426 bgcolor=#FFC2E0
| 455426 ||  || — || June 30, 2003 || Socorro || LINEAR || APO || align=right data-sort-value="0.69" | 690 m || 
|-id=427 bgcolor=#fefefe
| 455427 ||  || — || July 6, 2003 || Kitt Peak || Spacewatch || V || align=right data-sort-value="0.63" | 630 m || 
|-id=428 bgcolor=#FA8072
| 455428 ||  || — || August 23, 2003 || Palomar || NEAT || — || align=right data-sort-value="0.59" | 590 m || 
|-id=429 bgcolor=#fefefe
| 455429 ||  || — || August 19, 2003 || Saint-Sulpice || Saint-Sulpice Obs. || — || align=right | 1.0 km || 
|-id=430 bgcolor=#fefefe
| 455430 ||  || — || August 22, 2003 || Palomar || NEAT || — || align=right data-sort-value="0.78" | 780 m || 
|-id=431 bgcolor=#d6d6d6
| 455431 ||  || — || August 30, 2003 || Kitt Peak || Spacewatch || EOS || align=right | 1.5 km || 
|-id=432 bgcolor=#FFC2E0
| 455432 ||  || — || September 7, 2003 || Socorro || LINEAR || AMO +1km || align=right data-sort-value="0.81" | 810 m || 
|-id=433 bgcolor=#d6d6d6
| 455433 ||  || — || September 4, 2003 || Socorro || LINEAR || — || align=right | 3.3 km || 
|-id=434 bgcolor=#fefefe
| 455434 ||  || — || September 15, 2003 || Anderson Mesa || LONEOS || MAS || align=right data-sort-value="0.85" | 850 m || 
|-id=435 bgcolor=#fefefe
| 455435 ||  || — || September 17, 2003 || Kitt Peak || Spacewatch || NYS || align=right data-sort-value="0.75" | 750 m || 
|-id=436 bgcolor=#d6d6d6
| 455436 ||  || — || September 16, 2003 || Kitt Peak || Spacewatch || — || align=right | 1.9 km || 
|-id=437 bgcolor=#d6d6d6
| 455437 ||  || — || September 16, 2003 || Kitt Peak || Spacewatch || — || align=right | 2.6 km || 
|-id=438 bgcolor=#d6d6d6
| 455438 ||  || — || September 16, 2003 || Anderson Mesa || LONEOS || — || align=right | 3.5 km || 
|-id=439 bgcolor=#d6d6d6
| 455439 ||  || — || September 18, 2003 || Campo Imperatore || CINEOS || — || align=right | 3.3 km || 
|-id=440 bgcolor=#d6d6d6
| 455440 ||  || — || September 20, 2003 || Palomar || NEAT || — || align=right | 3.3 km || 
|-id=441 bgcolor=#fefefe
| 455441 ||  || — || September 17, 2003 || Kitt Peak || Spacewatch || — || align=right data-sort-value="0.75" | 750 m || 
|-id=442 bgcolor=#fefefe
| 455442 ||  || — || September 20, 2003 || Kitt Peak || Spacewatch || — || align=right data-sort-value="0.62" | 620 m || 
|-id=443 bgcolor=#fefefe
| 455443 ||  || — || September 17, 2003 || Kitt Peak || Spacewatch || — || align=right data-sort-value="0.78" | 780 m || 
|-id=444 bgcolor=#fefefe
| 455444 ||  || — || September 23, 2003 || Uccle || T. Pauwels || NYS || align=right data-sort-value="0.59" | 590 m || 
|-id=445 bgcolor=#fefefe
| 455445 ||  || — || September 20, 2003 || Socorro || LINEAR || — || align=right data-sort-value="0.85" | 850 m || 
|-id=446 bgcolor=#fefefe
| 455446 ||  || — || September 20, 2003 || Palomar || NEAT || — || align=right | 1.1 km || 
|-id=447 bgcolor=#d6d6d6
| 455447 ||  || — || September 20, 2003 || Kitt Peak || Spacewatch || — || align=right | 2.8 km || 
|-id=448 bgcolor=#fefefe
| 455448 ||  || — || September 24, 2003 || Palomar || NEAT || NYS || align=right data-sort-value="0.76" | 760 m || 
|-id=449 bgcolor=#fefefe
| 455449 ||  || — || September 27, 2003 || Socorro || LINEAR || NYS || align=right data-sort-value="0.84" | 840 m || 
|-id=450 bgcolor=#fefefe
| 455450 ||  || — || September 26, 2003 || Socorro || LINEAR || — || align=right data-sort-value="0.70" | 700 m || 
|-id=451 bgcolor=#fefefe
| 455451 ||  || — || September 27, 2003 || Socorro || LINEAR || — || align=right | 1.7 km || 
|-id=452 bgcolor=#d6d6d6
| 455452 ||  || — || September 26, 2003 || Socorro || LINEAR || — || align=right | 3.9 km || 
|-id=453 bgcolor=#d6d6d6
| 455453 ||  || — || September 16, 2003 || Kitt Peak || Spacewatch || — || align=right | 2.3 km || 
|-id=454 bgcolor=#d6d6d6
| 455454 ||  || — || September 26, 2003 || Apache Point || SDSS || — || align=right | 2.4 km || 
|-id=455 bgcolor=#fefefe
| 455455 ||  || — || September 16, 2003 || Kitt Peak || Spacewatch || — || align=right data-sort-value="0.65" | 650 m || 
|-id=456 bgcolor=#fefefe
| 455456 ||  || — || September 26, 2003 || Apache Point || SDSS || NYS || align=right data-sort-value="0.58" | 580 m || 
|-id=457 bgcolor=#fefefe
| 455457 ||  || — || September 26, 2003 || Apache Point || SDSS || MAS || align=right data-sort-value="0.60" | 600 m || 
|-id=458 bgcolor=#d6d6d6
| 455458 ||  || — || September 26, 2003 || Apache Point || SDSS || — || align=right | 2.5 km || 
|-id=459 bgcolor=#d6d6d6
| 455459 ||  || — || September 27, 2003 || Apache Point || SDSS || LIX || align=right | 2.6 km || 
|-id=460 bgcolor=#fefefe
| 455460 ||  || — || September 27, 2003 || Kitt Peak || Spacewatch || — || align=right data-sort-value="0.78" | 780 m || 
|-id=461 bgcolor=#d6d6d6
| 455461 ||  || — || September 19, 2003 || Anderson Mesa || LONEOS || — || align=right | 2.3 km || 
|-id=462 bgcolor=#d6d6d6
| 455462 ||  || — || September 28, 2003 || Kitt Peak || Spacewatch || — || align=right | 2.3 km || 
|-id=463 bgcolor=#d6d6d6
| 455463 ||  || — || September 16, 2003 || Kitt Peak || Spacewatch || EOS || align=right | 2.0 km || 
|-id=464 bgcolor=#fefefe
| 455464 ||  || — || October 5, 2003 || Kitt Peak || Spacewatch || — || align=right data-sort-value="0.77" | 770 m || 
|-id=465 bgcolor=#d6d6d6
| 455465 ||  || — || October 18, 2003 || Palomar || NEAT || — || align=right | 4.7 km || 
|-id=466 bgcolor=#d6d6d6
| 455466 ||  || — || September 21, 2003 || Anderson Mesa || LONEOS || — || align=right | 3.1 km || 
|-id=467 bgcolor=#d6d6d6
| 455467 ||  || — || October 5, 2003 || Socorro || LINEAR || — || align=right | 2.9 km || 
|-id=468 bgcolor=#d6d6d6
| 455468 ||  || — || October 18, 2003 || Palomar || NEAT || — || align=right | 3.0 km || 
|-id=469 bgcolor=#d6d6d6
| 455469 ||  || — || October 5, 2003 || Socorro || LINEAR || THB || align=right | 2.5 km || 
|-id=470 bgcolor=#fefefe
| 455470 ||  || — || October 19, 2003 || Kitt Peak || Spacewatch || — || align=right data-sort-value="0.85" | 850 m || 
|-id=471 bgcolor=#fefefe
| 455471 ||  || — || October 18, 2003 || Kitt Peak || Spacewatch || — || align=right | 1.4 km || 
|-id=472 bgcolor=#fefefe
| 455472 ||  || — || October 20, 2003 || Kitt Peak || Spacewatch || — || align=right | 1.1 km || 
|-id=473 bgcolor=#d6d6d6
| 455473 ||  || — || October 20, 2003 || Palomar || NEAT || EOS || align=right | 2.4 km || 
|-id=474 bgcolor=#fefefe
| 455474 ||  || — || October 18, 2003 || Anderson Mesa || LONEOS || — || align=right data-sort-value="0.94" | 940 m || 
|-id=475 bgcolor=#E9E9E9
| 455475 ||  || — || October 20, 2003 || Kitt Peak || Spacewatch || — || align=right data-sort-value="0.85" | 850 m || 
|-id=476 bgcolor=#fefefe
| 455476 ||  || — || October 21, 2003 || Palomar || NEAT || NYS || align=right data-sort-value="0.66" | 660 m || 
|-id=477 bgcolor=#d6d6d6
| 455477 ||  || — || October 23, 2003 || Anderson Mesa || LONEOS || — || align=right | 3.7 km || 
|-id=478 bgcolor=#d6d6d6
| 455478 ||  || — || October 20, 2003 || Palomar || NEAT || — || align=right | 2.6 km || 
|-id=479 bgcolor=#fefefe
| 455479 ||  || — || October 23, 2003 || Kitt Peak || Spacewatch || — || align=right data-sort-value="0.87" | 870 m || 
|-id=480 bgcolor=#d6d6d6
| 455480 ||  || — || October 23, 2003 || Kitt Peak || Spacewatch || — || align=right | 2.9 km || 
|-id=481 bgcolor=#d6d6d6
| 455481 ||  || — || October 23, 2003 || Anderson Mesa || LONEOS || — || align=right | 2.7 km || 
|-id=482 bgcolor=#d6d6d6
| 455482 ||  || — || September 22, 2003 || Kitt Peak || Spacewatch || — || align=right | 2.3 km || 
|-id=483 bgcolor=#d6d6d6
| 455483 ||  || — || October 28, 2003 || Socorro || LINEAR || — || align=right | 3.6 km || 
|-id=484 bgcolor=#d6d6d6
| 455484 ||  || — || September 27, 2003 || Kitt Peak || Spacewatch || — || align=right | 3.1 km || 
|-id=485 bgcolor=#d6d6d6
| 455485 ||  || — || September 28, 2003 || Kitt Peak || Spacewatch || — || align=right | 2.9 km || 
|-id=486 bgcolor=#fefefe
| 455486 ||  || — || October 16, 2003 || Kitt Peak || Spacewatch || — || align=right data-sort-value="0.62" | 620 m || 
|-id=487 bgcolor=#d6d6d6
| 455487 ||  || — || October 17, 2003 || Kitt Peak || Spacewatch || — || align=right | 3.2 km || 
|-id=488 bgcolor=#fefefe
| 455488 ||  || — || October 17, 2003 || Kitt Peak || Spacewatch || — || align=right data-sort-value="0.75" | 750 m || 
|-id=489 bgcolor=#fefefe
| 455489 ||  || — || October 18, 2003 || Apache Point || SDSS || — || align=right data-sort-value="0.70" | 700 m || 
|-id=490 bgcolor=#d6d6d6
| 455490 ||  || — || October 18, 2003 || Kitt Peak || Spacewatch || — || align=right | 1.9 km || 
|-id=491 bgcolor=#fefefe
| 455491 ||  || — || October 18, 2003 || Kitt Peak || Spacewatch || — || align=right data-sort-value="0.65" | 650 m || 
|-id=492 bgcolor=#d6d6d6
| 455492 ||  || — || September 21, 2003 || Kitt Peak || Spacewatch || THM || align=right | 1.7 km || 
|-id=493 bgcolor=#d6d6d6
| 455493 ||  || — || October 19, 2003 || Apache Point || SDSS || — || align=right | 2.7 km || 
|-id=494 bgcolor=#d6d6d6
| 455494 ||  || — || September 28, 2003 || Kitt Peak || Spacewatch || — || align=right | 2.3 km || 
|-id=495 bgcolor=#d6d6d6
| 455495 ||  || — || September 28, 2003 || Kitt Peak || Spacewatch || — || align=right | 2.6 km || 
|-id=496 bgcolor=#d6d6d6
| 455496 ||  || — || October 20, 2003 || Kitt Peak || Spacewatch || — || align=right | 2.2 km || 
|-id=497 bgcolor=#d6d6d6
| 455497 ||  || — || October 22, 2003 || Apache Point || SDSS || — || align=right | 3.8 km || 
|-id=498 bgcolor=#fefefe
| 455498 ||  || — || October 22, 2003 || Apache Point || SDSS || NYS || align=right data-sort-value="0.58" | 580 m || 
|-id=499 bgcolor=#d6d6d6
| 455499 ||  || — || October 22, 2003 || Apache Point || SDSS || — || align=right | 2.8 km || 
|-id=500 bgcolor=#fefefe
| 455500 ||  || — || October 22, 2003 || Apache Point || SDSS || — || align=right data-sort-value="0.78" | 780 m || 
|}

455501–455600 

|-bgcolor=#d6d6d6
| 455501 ||  || — || October 23, 2003 || Apache Point || SDSS || — || align=right | 2.0 km || 
|-id=502 bgcolor=#C2E0FF
| 455502 ||  || — || October 21, 2003 || Palomar || Palomar Obs. || plutino || align=right | 589 km || 
|-id=503 bgcolor=#d6d6d6
| 455503 ||  || — || November 15, 2003 || Needville || Needville Obs. || — || align=right | 3.0 km || 
|-id=504 bgcolor=#d6d6d6
| 455504 ||  || — || November 15, 2003 || Kitt Peak || Spacewatch || — || align=right | 3.2 km || 
|-id=505 bgcolor=#d6d6d6
| 455505 ||  || — || November 18, 2003 || Palomar || NEAT || — || align=right | 2.9 km || 
|-id=506 bgcolor=#E9E9E9
| 455506 ||  || — || November 18, 2003 || Kitt Peak || Spacewatch || — || align=right | 2.0 km || 
|-id=507 bgcolor=#fefefe
| 455507 ||  || — || October 20, 2003 || Kitt Peak || Spacewatch || NYS || align=right data-sort-value="0.63" | 630 m || 
|-id=508 bgcolor=#d6d6d6
| 455508 ||  || — || November 18, 2003 || Kitt Peak || Spacewatch || — || align=right | 2.6 km || 
|-id=509 bgcolor=#fefefe
| 455509 ||  || — || November 19, 2003 || Socorro || LINEAR || — || align=right data-sort-value="0.81" | 810 m || 
|-id=510 bgcolor=#fefefe
| 455510 ||  || — || October 25, 2003 || Socorro || LINEAR || — || align=right data-sort-value="0.73" | 730 m || 
|-id=511 bgcolor=#fefefe
| 455511 ||  || — || October 3, 2003 || Kitt Peak || Spacewatch || — || align=right data-sort-value="0.82" | 820 m || 
|-id=512 bgcolor=#d6d6d6
| 455512 ||  || — || November 21, 2003 || Kitt Peak || Spacewatch || — || align=right | 3.6 km || 
|-id=513 bgcolor=#FA8072
| 455513 ||  || — || November 19, 2003 || Anderson Mesa || LONEOS || — || align=right data-sort-value="0.65" | 650 m || 
|-id=514 bgcolor=#FA8072
| 455514 ||  || — || November 24, 2003 || Socorro || LINEAR || — || align=right data-sort-value="0.70" | 700 m || 
|-id=515 bgcolor=#d6d6d6
| 455515 ||  || — || November 21, 2003 || Socorro || LINEAR || — || align=right | 4.0 km || 
|-id=516 bgcolor=#FA8072
| 455516 ||  || — || November 23, 2003 || Catalina || CSS || H || align=right data-sort-value="0.61" | 610 m || 
|-id=517 bgcolor=#fefefe
| 455517 ||  || — || November 18, 2003 || Palomar || NEAT || — || align=right data-sort-value="0.90" | 900 m || 
|-id=518 bgcolor=#fefefe
| 455518 ||  || — || November 20, 2003 || Kitt Peak || M. W. Buie || MAS || align=right data-sort-value="0.65" | 650 m || 
|-id=519 bgcolor=#d6d6d6
| 455519 ||  || — || October 20, 2003 || Kitt Peak || Spacewatch || THM || align=right | 2.0 km || 
|-id=520 bgcolor=#d6d6d6
| 455520 ||  || — || November 23, 2003 || Kitt Peak || Spacewatch || — || align=right | 3.3 km || 
|-id=521 bgcolor=#d6d6d6
| 455521 ||  || — || December 1, 2003 || Socorro || LINEAR || — || align=right | 2.9 km || 
|-id=522 bgcolor=#d6d6d6
| 455522 ||  || — || November 21, 2003 || Kitt Peak || Spacewatch || — || align=right | 2.6 km || 
|-id=523 bgcolor=#fefefe
| 455523 ||  || — || December 18, 2003 || Socorro || LINEAR || — || align=right data-sort-value="0.74" | 740 m || 
|-id=524 bgcolor=#C2FFFF
| 455524 ||  || — || December 22, 2003 || Kitt Peak || Spacewatch || L5 || align=right | 9.8 km || 
|-id=525 bgcolor=#d6d6d6
| 455525 ||  || — || December 23, 2003 || Socorro || LINEAR || Tj (2.98) || align=right | 6.7 km || 
|-id=526 bgcolor=#d6d6d6
| 455526 ||  || — || December 28, 2003 || Kitt Peak || Spacewatch || — || align=right | 3.6 km || 
|-id=527 bgcolor=#E9E9E9
| 455527 ||  || — || December 18, 2003 || Kitt Peak || Spacewatch || — || align=right | 1.3 km || 
|-id=528 bgcolor=#d6d6d6
| 455528 ||  || — || December 18, 2003 || Kitt Peak || Spacewatch || Tj (2.98) || align=right | 4.9 km || 
|-id=529 bgcolor=#fefefe
| 455529 ||  || — || January 16, 2004 || Anderson Mesa || LONEOS || — || align=right data-sort-value="0.80" | 800 m || 
|-id=530 bgcolor=#E9E9E9
| 455530 ||  || — || January 19, 2004 || Socorro || LINEAR || — || align=right | 1.7 km || 
|-id=531 bgcolor=#E9E9E9
| 455531 ||  || — || January 24, 2004 || Socorro || LINEAR || EUN || align=right | 1.5 km || 
|-id=532 bgcolor=#d6d6d6
| 455532 ||  || — || January 22, 2004 || Socorro || LINEAR || — || align=right | 3.1 km || 
|-id=533 bgcolor=#E9E9E9
| 455533 ||  || — || January 19, 2004 || Kitt Peak || Spacewatch || — || align=right data-sort-value="0.69" | 690 m || 
|-id=534 bgcolor=#E9E9E9
| 455534 ||  || — || January 22, 2004 || Socorro || LINEAR || — || align=right | 1.1 km || 
|-id=535 bgcolor=#E9E9E9
| 455535 ||  || — || February 10, 2004 || Palomar || NEAT || — || align=right | 1.1 km || 
|-id=536 bgcolor=#d6d6d6
| 455536 ||  || — || February 11, 2004 || Kitt Peak || Spacewatch || — || align=right | 3.1 km || 
|-id=537 bgcolor=#d6d6d6
| 455537 ||  || — || February 12, 2004 || Kitt Peak || Spacewatch || — || align=right | 3.1 km || 
|-id=538 bgcolor=#d6d6d6
| 455538 ||  || — || February 15, 2004 || Socorro || LINEAR || — || align=right | 3.4 km || 
|-id=539 bgcolor=#E9E9E9
| 455539 ||  || — || February 13, 2004 || Kitt Peak || Spacewatch || — || align=right data-sort-value="0.78" | 780 m || 
|-id=540 bgcolor=#E9E9E9
| 455540 ||  || — || February 22, 2004 || Kitt Peak || Spacewatch || — || align=right data-sort-value="0.92" | 920 m || 
|-id=541 bgcolor=#E9E9E9
| 455541 ||  || — || March 12, 2004 || Palomar || NEAT || — || align=right data-sort-value="0.89" | 890 m || 
|-id=542 bgcolor=#E9E9E9
| 455542 ||  || — || March 19, 2004 || Socorro || LINEAR || — || align=right | 1.1 km || 
|-id=543 bgcolor=#E9E9E9
| 455543 ||  || — || March 16, 2004 || Kitt Peak || Spacewatch || — || align=right | 1.2 km || 
|-id=544 bgcolor=#E9E9E9
| 455544 ||  || — || April 12, 2004 || Catalina || CSS || — || align=right | 1.2 km || 
|-id=545 bgcolor=#E9E9E9
| 455545 ||  || — || April 12, 2004 || Kitt Peak || Spacewatch || — || align=right data-sort-value="0.98" | 980 m || 
|-id=546 bgcolor=#E9E9E9
| 455546 ||  || — || April 13, 2004 || Kitt Peak || Spacewatch || — || align=right | 1.1 km || 
|-id=547 bgcolor=#FA8072
| 455547 ||  || — || April 21, 2004 || Socorro || LINEAR || — || align=right data-sort-value="0.64" | 640 m || 
|-id=548 bgcolor=#E9E9E9
| 455548 ||  || — || April 24, 2004 || Kitt Peak || Spacewatch || — || align=right | 1.6 km || 
|-id=549 bgcolor=#E9E9E9
| 455549 ||  || — || April 24, 2004 || Kitt Peak || Spacewatch || — || align=right | 1.2 km || 
|-id=550 bgcolor=#FFC2E0
| 455550 ||  || — || May 12, 2004 || Anderson Mesa || LONEOS || APO +1km || align=right | 1.3 km || 
|-id=551 bgcolor=#E9E9E9
| 455551 ||  || — || April 28, 2004 || Kitt Peak || Spacewatch || — || align=right | 1.4 km || 
|-id=552 bgcolor=#E9E9E9
| 455552 ||  || — || May 23, 2004 || Kitt Peak || Spacewatch || — || align=right | 1.5 km || 
|-id=553 bgcolor=#E9E9E9
| 455553 ||  || — || June 9, 2004 || Kitt Peak || Spacewatch || — || align=right | 1.9 km || 
|-id=554 bgcolor=#FFC2E0
| 455554 ||  || — || June 17, 2004 || Siding Spring || SSS || APO +1km || align=right data-sort-value="0.89" | 890 m || 
|-id=555 bgcolor=#E9E9E9
| 455555 ||  || — || July 14, 2004 || Socorro || LINEAR || — || align=right | 3.2 km || 
|-id=556 bgcolor=#FA8072
| 455556 ||  || — || July 11, 2004 || Socorro || LINEAR || — || align=right data-sort-value="0.95" | 950 m || 
|-id=557 bgcolor=#FA8072
| 455557 ||  || — || July 11, 2004 || Socorro || LINEAR || H || align=right data-sort-value="0.69" | 690 m || 
|-id=558 bgcolor=#fefefe
| 455558 ||  || — || July 15, 2004 || Socorro || LINEAR || — || align=right | 1.4 km || 
|-id=559 bgcolor=#E9E9E9
| 455559 ||  || — || July 27, 2004 || Socorro || LINEAR || — || align=right | 1.7 km || 
|-id=560 bgcolor=#fefefe
| 455560 ||  || — || August 5, 2004 || Palomar || NEAT || H || align=right data-sort-value="0.75" | 750 m || 
|-id=561 bgcolor=#E9E9E9
| 455561 ||  || — || July 25, 2004 || Anderson Mesa || LONEOS || — || align=right | 1.5 km || 
|-id=562 bgcolor=#fefefe
| 455562 ||  || — || August 8, 2004 || Campo Imperatore || CINEOS || — || align=right data-sort-value="0.71" | 710 m || 
|-id=563 bgcolor=#fefefe
| 455563 ||  || — || August 10, 2004 || Socorro || LINEAR || — || align=right data-sort-value="0.97" | 970 m || 
|-id=564 bgcolor=#fefefe
| 455564 ||  || — || August 25, 2004 || Socorro || LINEAR || — || align=right | 1.4 km || 
|-id=565 bgcolor=#E9E9E9
| 455565 ||  || — || August 20, 2004 || Catalina || CSS || (1547) || align=right | 1.7 km || 
|-id=566 bgcolor=#fefefe
| 455566 ||  || — || September 4, 2004 || Palomar || NEAT || — || align=right | 2.2 km || 
|-id=567 bgcolor=#fefefe
| 455567 ||  || — || September 7, 2004 || Socorro || LINEAR || — || align=right | 1.0 km || 
|-id=568 bgcolor=#fefefe
| 455568 ||  || — || September 7, 2004 || Socorro || LINEAR || — || align=right data-sort-value="0.75" | 750 m || 
|-id=569 bgcolor=#fefefe
| 455569 ||  || — || August 11, 2004 || Socorro || LINEAR || — || align=right data-sort-value="0.85" | 850 m || 
|-id=570 bgcolor=#d6d6d6
| 455570 ||  || — || September 7, 2004 || Socorro || LINEAR || — || align=right | 2.6 km || 
|-id=571 bgcolor=#fefefe
| 455571 ||  || — || September 8, 2004 || Socorro || LINEAR || NYS || align=right data-sort-value="0.55" | 550 m || 
|-id=572 bgcolor=#fefefe
| 455572 ||  || — || September 8, 2004 || Socorro || LINEAR || — || align=right data-sort-value="0.94" | 940 m || 
|-id=573 bgcolor=#fefefe
| 455573 ||  || — || September 8, 2004 || Socorro || LINEAR || — || align=right data-sort-value="0.61" | 610 m || 
|-id=574 bgcolor=#fefefe
| 455574 ||  || — || September 8, 2004 || Socorro || LINEAR || — || align=right data-sort-value="0.88" | 880 m || 
|-id=575 bgcolor=#E9E9E9
| 455575 ||  || — || September 7, 2004 || Socorro || LINEAR || — || align=right | 3.1 km || 
|-id=576 bgcolor=#fefefe
| 455576 ||  || — || September 10, 2004 || Socorro || LINEAR || — || align=right data-sort-value="0.75" | 750 m || 
|-id=577 bgcolor=#fefefe
| 455577 ||  || — || September 10, 2004 || Socorro || LINEAR || — || align=right data-sort-value="0.83" | 830 m || 
|-id=578 bgcolor=#FA8072
| 455578 ||  || — || September 11, 2004 || Socorro || LINEAR || — || align=right data-sort-value="0.85" | 850 m || 
|-id=579 bgcolor=#d6d6d6
| 455579 ||  || — || September 11, 2004 || Socorro || LINEAR || — || align=right | 2.7 km || 
|-id=580 bgcolor=#fefefe
| 455580 ||  || — || September 10, 2004 || Kitt Peak || Spacewatch || — || align=right data-sort-value="0.70" | 700 m || 
|-id=581 bgcolor=#fefefe
| 455581 ||  || — || September 15, 2004 || Socorro || LINEAR || H || align=right data-sort-value="0.89" | 890 m || 
|-id=582 bgcolor=#d6d6d6
| 455582 ||  || — || September 11, 2004 || Kitt Peak || Spacewatch || — || align=right | 2.0 km || 
|-id=583 bgcolor=#fefefe
| 455583 ||  || — || September 11, 2004 || Kitt Peak || Spacewatch || — || align=right data-sort-value="0.64" | 640 m || 
|-id=584 bgcolor=#fefefe
| 455584 ||  || — || September 13, 2004 || Palomar || NEAT || — || align=right data-sort-value="0.72" | 720 m || 
|-id=585 bgcolor=#fefefe
| 455585 ||  || — || September 8, 2004 || Socorro || LINEAR || — || align=right data-sort-value="0.66" | 660 m || 
|-id=586 bgcolor=#fefefe
| 455586 ||  || — || September 7, 2004 || Kitt Peak || Spacewatch || H || align=right data-sort-value="0.64" | 640 m || 
|-id=587 bgcolor=#fefefe
| 455587 ||  || — || September 10, 2004 || Socorro || LINEAR || — || align=right data-sort-value="0.96" | 960 m || 
|-id=588 bgcolor=#FFC2E0
| 455588 ||  || — || September 15, 2004 || Socorro || LINEAR || APO || align=right data-sort-value="0.28" | 280 m || 
|-id=589 bgcolor=#fefefe
| 455589 ||  || — || September 15, 2004 || Kitt Peak || Spacewatch || NYS || align=right data-sort-value="0.59" | 590 m || 
|-id=590 bgcolor=#fefefe
| 455590 ||  || — || September 10, 2004 || Socorro || LINEAR || — || align=right data-sort-value="0.88" | 880 m || 
|-id=591 bgcolor=#FFC2E0
| 455591 ||  || — || September 23, 2004 || Socorro || LINEAR || AMO || align=right data-sort-value="0.71" | 710 m || 
|-id=592 bgcolor=#d6d6d6
| 455592 ||  || — || September 17, 2004 || Kitt Peak || Spacewatch || — || align=right | 2.1 km || 
|-id=593 bgcolor=#d6d6d6
| 455593 ||  || — || September 10, 2004 || Socorro || LINEAR || — || align=right | 3.1 km || 
|-id=594 bgcolor=#FFC2E0
| 455594 ||  || — || September 24, 2004 || Socorro || LINEAR || APO +1km || align=right | 1.6 km || 
|-id=595 bgcolor=#fefefe
| 455595 ||  || — || October 4, 2004 || Kitt Peak || Spacewatch || — || align=right data-sort-value="0.57" | 570 m || 
|-id=596 bgcolor=#fefefe
| 455596 ||  || — || October 4, 2004 || Kitt Peak || Spacewatch || — || align=right data-sort-value="0.72" | 720 m || 
|-id=597 bgcolor=#fefefe
| 455597 ||  || — || September 22, 2004 || Kitt Peak || Spacewatch || — || align=right data-sort-value="0.78" | 780 m || 
|-id=598 bgcolor=#fefefe
| 455598 ||  || — || October 4, 2004 || Kitt Peak || Spacewatch || — || align=right data-sort-value="0.75" | 750 m || 
|-id=599 bgcolor=#fefefe
| 455599 ||  || — || October 4, 2004 || Kitt Peak || Spacewatch || — || align=right data-sort-value="0.73" | 730 m || 
|-id=600 bgcolor=#fefefe
| 455600 ||  || — || October 4, 2004 || Kitt Peak || Spacewatch || — || align=right data-sort-value="0.73" | 730 m || 
|}

455601–455700 

|-bgcolor=#fefefe
| 455601 ||  || — || October 4, 2004 || Kitt Peak || Spacewatch || (2076) || align=right data-sort-value="0.67" | 670 m || 
|-id=602 bgcolor=#d6d6d6
| 455602 ||  || — || October 5, 2004 || Kitt Peak || Spacewatch || KOR || align=right | 1.2 km || 
|-id=603 bgcolor=#d6d6d6
| 455603 ||  || — || October 5, 2004 || Kitt Peak || Spacewatch || KOR || align=right | 1.1 km || 
|-id=604 bgcolor=#d6d6d6
| 455604 ||  || — || October 5, 2004 || Kitt Peak || Spacewatch || KOR || align=right | 1.4 km || 
|-id=605 bgcolor=#d6d6d6
| 455605 ||  || — || October 6, 2004 || Kitt Peak || Spacewatch || EOS || align=right | 1.8 km || 
|-id=606 bgcolor=#fefefe
| 455606 ||  || — || September 8, 2004 || Socorro || LINEAR || — || align=right data-sort-value="0.98" | 980 m || 
|-id=607 bgcolor=#fefefe
| 455607 ||  || — || September 10, 2004 || Kitt Peak || Spacewatch || — || align=right data-sort-value="0.66" | 660 m || 
|-id=608 bgcolor=#fefefe
| 455608 ||  || — || October 6, 2004 || Kitt Peak || Spacewatch || — || align=right data-sort-value="0.89" | 890 m || 
|-id=609 bgcolor=#E9E9E9
| 455609 ||  || — || October 6, 2004 || Kitt Peak || Spacewatch || — || align=right | 2.3 km || 
|-id=610 bgcolor=#fefefe
| 455610 ||  || — || September 10, 2004 || Kitt Peak || Spacewatch || — || align=right data-sort-value="0.70" | 700 m || 
|-id=611 bgcolor=#fefefe
| 455611 ||  || — || October 9, 2004 || Socorro || LINEAR || — || align=right data-sort-value="0.68" | 680 m || 
|-id=612 bgcolor=#d6d6d6
| 455612 ||  || — || October 7, 2004 || Kitt Peak || Spacewatch || — || align=right | 2.0 km || 
|-id=613 bgcolor=#fefefe
| 455613 ||  || — || October 7, 2004 || Kitt Peak || Spacewatch || — || align=right data-sort-value="0.87" | 870 m || 
|-id=614 bgcolor=#fefefe
| 455614 ||  || — || October 9, 2004 || Socorro || LINEAR || — || align=right data-sort-value="0.78" | 780 m || 
|-id=615 bgcolor=#fefefe
| 455615 ||  || — || October 9, 2004 || Kitt Peak || Spacewatch || — || align=right data-sort-value="0.58" | 580 m || 
|-id=616 bgcolor=#fefefe
| 455616 ||  || — || October 9, 2004 || Kitt Peak || Spacewatch || — || align=right data-sort-value="0.70" | 700 m || 
|-id=617 bgcolor=#fefefe
| 455617 ||  || — || October 10, 2004 || Socorro || LINEAR || — || align=right data-sort-value="0.79" | 790 m || 
|-id=618 bgcolor=#fefefe
| 455618 ||  || — || October 7, 2004 || Kitt Peak || Spacewatch || — || align=right data-sort-value="0.71" | 710 m || 
|-id=619 bgcolor=#fefefe
| 455619 ||  || — || October 9, 2004 || Kitt Peak || Spacewatch || — || align=right data-sort-value="0.57" | 570 m || 
|-id=620 bgcolor=#fefefe
| 455620 ||  || — || October 8, 2004 || Kitt Peak || Spacewatch || — || align=right data-sort-value="0.59" | 590 m || 
|-id=621 bgcolor=#d6d6d6
| 455621 ||  || — || October 21, 2004 || Socorro || LINEAR || — || align=right | 2.5 km || 
|-id=622 bgcolor=#fefefe
| 455622 ||  || — || October 13, 2004 || Kitt Peak || Spacewatch || — || align=right data-sort-value="0.66" | 660 m || 
|-id=623 bgcolor=#d6d6d6
| 455623 ||  || — || November 3, 2004 || Kitt Peak || Spacewatch || — || align=right | 1.8 km || 
|-id=624 bgcolor=#fefefe
| 455624 ||  || — || November 3, 2004 || Kitt Peak || Spacewatch || — || align=right data-sort-value="0.74" | 740 m || 
|-id=625 bgcolor=#fefefe
| 455625 ||  || — || October 10, 2004 || Kitt Peak || Spacewatch || — || align=right data-sort-value="0.63" | 630 m || 
|-id=626 bgcolor=#fefefe
| 455626 ||  || — || November 4, 2004 || Kitt Peak || Spacewatch || — || align=right data-sort-value="0.86" | 860 m || 
|-id=627 bgcolor=#fefefe
| 455627 ||  || — || November 4, 2004 || Kitt Peak || Spacewatch || NYS || align=right data-sort-value="0.61" | 610 m || 
|-id=628 bgcolor=#d6d6d6
| 455628 ||  || — || November 4, 2004 || Kitt Peak || Spacewatch || — || align=right | 2.5 km || 
|-id=629 bgcolor=#E9E9E9
| 455629 ||  || — || November 3, 2004 || Catalina || CSS || — || align=right | 2.0 km || 
|-id=630 bgcolor=#fefefe
| 455630 ||  || — || November 4, 2004 || Catalina || CSS || — || align=right data-sort-value="0.69" | 690 m || 
|-id=631 bgcolor=#d6d6d6
| 455631 ||  || — || October 11, 2004 || Kitt Peak || Spacewatch || — || align=right | 2.1 km || 
|-id=632 bgcolor=#fefefe
| 455632 ||  || — || November 9, 2004 || Catalina || CSS || — || align=right data-sort-value="0.62" | 620 m || 
|-id=633 bgcolor=#fefefe
| 455633 ||  || — || November 17, 2004 || Siding Spring || SSS || H || align=right data-sort-value="0.63" | 630 m || 
|-id=634 bgcolor=#d6d6d6
| 455634 ||  || — || December 1, 2004 || Palomar || NEAT || — || align=right | 3.3 km || 
|-id=635 bgcolor=#fefefe
| 455635 ||  || — || December 13, 1996 || Kitt Peak || Spacewatch || H || align=right data-sort-value="0.91" | 910 m || 
|-id=636 bgcolor=#d6d6d6
| 455636 ||  || — || December 3, 2004 || Kitt Peak || Spacewatch || Tj (2.99) || align=right | 3.3 km || 
|-id=637 bgcolor=#fefefe
| 455637 ||  || — || December 8, 2004 || Socorro || LINEAR || — || align=right data-sort-value="0.79" | 790 m || 
|-id=638 bgcolor=#d6d6d6
| 455638 ||  || — || December 10, 2004 || Kitt Peak || Spacewatch || — || align=right | 2.0 km || 
|-id=639 bgcolor=#fefefe
| 455639 ||  || — || November 11, 2004 || Catalina || CSS || H || align=right data-sort-value="0.87" | 870 m || 
|-id=640 bgcolor=#d6d6d6
| 455640 ||  || — || December 11, 2004 || Anderson Mesa || LONEOS || — || align=right | 3.3 km || 
|-id=641 bgcolor=#fefefe
| 455641 ||  || — || December 10, 2004 || Socorro || LINEAR || — || align=right data-sort-value="0.80" | 800 m || 
|-id=642 bgcolor=#d6d6d6
| 455642 ||  || — || December 11, 2004 || Kitt Peak || Spacewatch || — || align=right | 3.7 km || 
|-id=643 bgcolor=#d6d6d6
| 455643 ||  || — || December 11, 2004 || Kitt Peak || Spacewatch || — || align=right | 2.3 km || 
|-id=644 bgcolor=#fefefe
| 455644 ||  || — || December 12, 2004 || Kitt Peak || Spacewatch || — || align=right data-sort-value="0.71" | 710 m || 
|-id=645 bgcolor=#fefefe
| 455645 ||  || — || November 10, 2004 || Kitt Peak || Spacewatch || H || align=right data-sort-value="0.74" | 740 m || 
|-id=646 bgcolor=#d6d6d6
| 455646 ||  || — || December 12, 2004 || Kitt Peak || Spacewatch || TIR || align=right | 3.2 km || 
|-id=647 bgcolor=#d6d6d6
| 455647 ||  || — || December 2, 2004 || Kitt Peak || Spacewatch || — || align=right | 3.2 km || 
|-id=648 bgcolor=#fefefe
| 455648 ||  || — || December 18, 2004 || Mount Lemmon || Mount Lemmon Survey || — || align=right data-sort-value="0.78" | 780 m || 
|-id=649 bgcolor=#fefefe
| 455649 || 2005 AP || — || January 5, 2005 || Pla D'Arguines || Pla D'Arguines Obs. || — || align=right data-sort-value="0.70" | 700 m || 
|-id=650 bgcolor=#fefefe
| 455650 ||  || — || January 6, 2005 || Catalina || CSS || H || align=right data-sort-value="0.87" | 870 m || 
|-id=651 bgcolor=#fefefe
| 455651 ||  || — || January 6, 2005 || Catalina || CSS || H || align=right data-sort-value="0.87" | 870 m || 
|-id=652 bgcolor=#fefefe
| 455652 ||  || — || December 20, 2004 || Mount Lemmon || Mount Lemmon Survey || — || align=right | 1.2 km || 
|-id=653 bgcolor=#fefefe
| 455653 ||  || — || December 20, 2004 || Mount Lemmon || Mount Lemmon Survey || — || align=right data-sort-value="0.72" | 720 m || 
|-id=654 bgcolor=#d6d6d6
| 455654 ||  || — || January 13, 2005 || Kitt Peak || Spacewatch || LIX || align=right | 4.8 km || 
|-id=655 bgcolor=#fefefe
| 455655 ||  || — || January 15, 2005 || Kitt Peak || Spacewatch || — || align=right | 1.0 km || 
|-id=656 bgcolor=#d6d6d6
| 455656 ||  || — || December 20, 2004 || Mount Lemmon || Mount Lemmon Survey || — || align=right | 2.5 km || 
|-id=657 bgcolor=#d6d6d6
| 455657 ||  || — || January 6, 2005 || Catalina || CSS || — || align=right | 4.2 km || 
|-id=658 bgcolor=#fefefe
| 455658 ||  || — || January 8, 2005 || Campo Imperatore || CINEOS || — || align=right data-sort-value="0.80" | 800 m || 
|-id=659 bgcolor=#FFC2E0
| 455659 ||  || — || January 17, 2005 || Kitt Peak || Spacewatch || ATE || align=right data-sort-value="0.19" | 190 m || 
|-id=660 bgcolor=#d6d6d6
| 455660 ||  || — || January 16, 2005 || Socorro || LINEAR || — || align=right | 2.1 km || 
|-id=661 bgcolor=#fefefe
| 455661 ||  || — || December 18, 2004 || Mount Lemmon || Mount Lemmon Survey || — || align=right data-sort-value="0.73" | 730 m || 
|-id=662 bgcolor=#fefefe
| 455662 ||  || — || January 16, 2005 || Kitt Peak || Spacewatch || — || align=right data-sort-value="0.91" | 910 m || 
|-id=663 bgcolor=#d6d6d6
| 455663 ||  || — || December 18, 2004 || Mount Lemmon || Mount Lemmon Survey || — || align=right | 2.4 km || 
|-id=664 bgcolor=#fefefe
| 455664 ||  || — || February 1, 2005 || Palomar || NEAT || H || align=right data-sort-value="0.92" | 920 m || 
|-id=665 bgcolor=#d6d6d6
| 455665 ||  || — || February 1, 2005 || Catalina || CSS || — || align=right | 4.5 km || 
|-id=666 bgcolor=#fefefe
| 455666 ||  || — || February 2, 2005 || Socorro || LINEAR || NYS || align=right data-sort-value="0.60" | 600 m || 
|-id=667 bgcolor=#d6d6d6
| 455667 ||  || — || February 1, 2005 || Kitt Peak || Spacewatch || — || align=right | 3.5 km || 
|-id=668 bgcolor=#d6d6d6
| 455668 ||  || — || February 2, 2005 || Socorro || LINEAR || — || align=right | 4.6 km || 
|-id=669 bgcolor=#d6d6d6
| 455669 ||  || — || February 3, 2005 || Calvin-Rehoboth || Calvin–Rehoboth Obs. || — || align=right | 2.2 km || 
|-id=670 bgcolor=#d6d6d6
| 455670 ||  || — || February 9, 2005 || Socorro || LINEAR || Tj (2.89) || align=right | 4.5 km || 
|-id=671 bgcolor=#d6d6d6
| 455671 ||  || — || February 1, 2005 || Kitt Peak || Spacewatch || TIR || align=right | 2.1 km || 
|-id=672 bgcolor=#FA8072
| 455672 || 2005 DE || — || February 18, 2005 || La Silla || A. Boattini, H. Scholl || criticalTj (2.88) || align=right | 1.9 km || 
|-id=673 bgcolor=#fefefe
| 455673 ||  || — || February 17, 2005 || La Silla || A. Boattini, H. Scholl || — || align=right data-sort-value="0.57" | 570 m || 
|-id=674 bgcolor=#d6d6d6
| 455674 ||  || — || March 3, 2005 || Socorro || LINEAR || Tj (2.94) || align=right | 3.5 km || 
|-id=675 bgcolor=#fefefe
| 455675 ||  || — || March 1, 2005 || Kitt Peak || Spacewatch || NYS || align=right data-sort-value="0.71" | 710 m || 
|-id=676 bgcolor=#d6d6d6
| 455676 ||  || — || March 2, 2005 || Kitt Peak || Spacewatch || — || align=right | 3.7 km || 
|-id=677 bgcolor=#fefefe
| 455677 ||  || — || February 3, 2005 || Socorro || LINEAR || — || align=right data-sort-value="0.87" | 870 m || 
|-id=678 bgcolor=#fefefe
| 455678 ||  || — || March 3, 2005 || Kitt Peak || Spacewatch || — || align=right data-sort-value="0.69" | 690 m || 
|-id=679 bgcolor=#fefefe
| 455679 ||  || — || March 3, 2005 || Catalina || CSS || MAS || align=right data-sort-value="0.67" | 670 m || 
|-id=680 bgcolor=#d6d6d6
| 455680 ||  || — || March 3, 2005 || Catalina || CSS || Tj (2.98) || align=right | 3.5 km || 
|-id=681 bgcolor=#fefefe
| 455681 ||  || — || March 1, 2005 || Kitt Peak || Spacewatch || H || align=right data-sort-value="0.76" | 760 m || 
|-id=682 bgcolor=#d6d6d6
| 455682 ||  || — || March 3, 2005 || Catalina || CSS || — || align=right | 3.5 km || 
|-id=683 bgcolor=#fefefe
| 455683 ||  || — || March 4, 2005 || Kitt Peak || Spacewatch || — || align=right data-sort-value="0.92" | 920 m || 
|-id=684 bgcolor=#d6d6d6
| 455684 ||  || — || March 4, 2005 || Kvistaberg || UDAS || Tj (2.99) || align=right | 4.9 km || 
|-id=685 bgcolor=#d6d6d6
| 455685 ||  || — || March 3, 2005 || Catalina || CSS || — || align=right | 4.3 km || 
|-id=686 bgcolor=#d6d6d6
| 455686 ||  || — || March 8, 2005 || Kitt Peak || Spacewatch || — || align=right | 3.9 km || 
|-id=687 bgcolor=#FFC2E0
| 455687 ||  || — || March 9, 2005 || Catalina || CSS || AMOPHAcritical || align=right data-sort-value="0.49" | 490 m || 
|-id=688 bgcolor=#d6d6d6
| 455688 ||  || — || March 3, 2005 || Catalina || CSS || — || align=right | 5.1 km || 
|-id=689 bgcolor=#d6d6d6
| 455689 ||  || — || March 3, 2005 || Kitt Peak || Spacewatch || Tj (2.99) || align=right | 3.1 km || 
|-id=690 bgcolor=#fefefe
| 455690 ||  || — || March 4, 2005 || Mount Lemmon || Mount Lemmon Survey || — || align=right data-sort-value="0.64" | 640 m || 
|-id=691 bgcolor=#fefefe
| 455691 ||  || — || March 8, 2005 || Kitt Peak || Spacewatch || — || align=right data-sort-value="0.71" | 710 m || 
|-id=692 bgcolor=#fefefe
| 455692 ||  || — || March 8, 2005 || Mount Lemmon || Mount Lemmon Survey || — || align=right data-sort-value="0.78" | 780 m || 
|-id=693 bgcolor=#d6d6d6
| 455693 ||  || — || March 10, 2005 || Kitt Peak || Spacewatch || — || align=right | 2.1 km || 
|-id=694 bgcolor=#fefefe
| 455694 ||  || — || January 16, 2005 || Catalina || CSS || — || align=right | 1.5 km || 
|-id=695 bgcolor=#fefefe
| 455695 ||  || — || March 8, 2005 || Kitt Peak || Spacewatch || — || align=right data-sort-value="0.87" | 870 m || 
|-id=696 bgcolor=#d6d6d6
| 455696 ||  || — || March 9, 2005 || Mount Lemmon || Mount Lemmon Survey || — || align=right | 3.4 km || 
|-id=697 bgcolor=#fefefe
| 455697 ||  || — || March 10, 2005 || Mount Lemmon || Mount Lemmon Survey || — || align=right data-sort-value="0.68" | 680 m || 
|-id=698 bgcolor=#d6d6d6
| 455698 ||  || — || March 11, 2005 || Mount Lemmon || Mount Lemmon Survey || — || align=right | 2.1 km || 
|-id=699 bgcolor=#d6d6d6
| 455699 ||  || — || March 11, 2005 || Mount Lemmon || Mount Lemmon Survey || — || align=right | 2.9 km || 
|-id=700 bgcolor=#fefefe
| 455700 ||  || — || March 3, 2005 || Catalina || CSS || NYS || align=right data-sort-value="0.63" | 630 m || 
|}

455701–455800 

|-bgcolor=#fefefe
| 455701 ||  || — || March 4, 2005 || Kitt Peak || Spacewatch || — || align=right data-sort-value="0.82" | 820 m || 
|-id=702 bgcolor=#fefefe
| 455702 ||  || — || March 4, 2005 || Socorro || LINEAR || — || align=right | 1.1 km || 
|-id=703 bgcolor=#d6d6d6
| 455703 ||  || — || March 4, 2005 || Mount Lemmon || Mount Lemmon Survey || — || align=right | 4.0 km || 
|-id=704 bgcolor=#fefefe
| 455704 ||  || — || March 11, 2005 || Catalina || CSS || — || align=right data-sort-value="0.79" | 790 m || 
|-id=705 bgcolor=#d6d6d6
| 455705 ||  || — || March 11, 2005 || Anderson Mesa || LONEOS || — || align=right | 4.1 km || 
|-id=706 bgcolor=#d6d6d6
| 455706 ||  || — || March 12, 2005 || Kitt Peak || Spacewatch || — || align=right | 2.9 km || 
|-id=707 bgcolor=#d6d6d6
| 455707 ||  || — || March 13, 2005 || Kitt Peak || Spacewatch || — || align=right | 3.0 km || 
|-id=708 bgcolor=#d6d6d6
| 455708 ||  || — || March 14, 2005 || Mount Lemmon || Mount Lemmon Survey || — || align=right | 4.3 km || 
|-id=709 bgcolor=#d6d6d6
| 455709 ||  || — || March 10, 2005 || Catalina || CSS || — || align=right | 3.3 km || 
|-id=710 bgcolor=#fefefe
| 455710 ||  || — || February 9, 2005 || Mount Lemmon || Mount Lemmon Survey || — || align=right data-sort-value="0.89" | 890 m || 
|-id=711 bgcolor=#d6d6d6
| 455711 ||  || — || March 11, 2005 || Kitt Peak || Spacewatch || — || align=right | 2.9 km || 
|-id=712 bgcolor=#d6d6d6
| 455712 ||  || — || March 12, 2005 || Kitt Peak || M. W. Buie || — || align=right | 2.8 km || 
|-id=713 bgcolor=#d6d6d6
| 455713 ||  || — || March 16, 2005 || Catalina || CSS || — || align=right | 3.0 km || 
|-id=714 bgcolor=#fefefe
| 455714 ||  || — || April 2, 2005 || Kitt Peak || Spacewatch || — || align=right data-sort-value="0.93" | 930 m || 
|-id=715 bgcolor=#d6d6d6
| 455715 ||  || — || April 4, 2005 || Catalina || CSS || — || align=right | 3.8 km || 
|-id=716 bgcolor=#fefefe
| 455716 ||  || — || April 2, 2005 || Mount Lemmon || Mount Lemmon Survey || — || align=right data-sort-value="0.74" | 740 m || 
|-id=717 bgcolor=#E9E9E9
| 455717 ||  || — || April 4, 2005 || Kitt Peak || Spacewatch || — || align=right | 1.2 km || 
|-id=718 bgcolor=#fefefe
| 455718 ||  || — || April 5, 2005 || Mount Lemmon || Mount Lemmon Survey || NYS || align=right data-sort-value="0.66" | 660 m || 
|-id=719 bgcolor=#d6d6d6
| 455719 ||  || — || March 10, 2005 || Mount Lemmon || Mount Lemmon Survey || — || align=right | 2.8 km || 
|-id=720 bgcolor=#d6d6d6
| 455720 ||  || — || March 10, 2005 || Catalina || CSS || — || align=right | 2.7 km || 
|-id=721 bgcolor=#d6d6d6
| 455721 ||  || — || April 2, 2005 || Catalina || CSS || — || align=right | 2.4 km || 
|-id=722 bgcolor=#d6d6d6
| 455722 ||  || — || March 17, 2005 || Mount Lemmon || Mount Lemmon Survey || — || align=right | 2.6 km || 
|-id=723 bgcolor=#fefefe
| 455723 ||  || — || April 6, 2005 || Kitt Peak || Spacewatch || — || align=right data-sort-value="0.79" | 790 m || 
|-id=724 bgcolor=#fefefe
| 455724 ||  || — || April 11, 2005 || Kitt Peak || Spacewatch || — || align=right data-sort-value="0.64" | 640 m || 
|-id=725 bgcolor=#fefefe
| 455725 ||  || — || March 4, 2005 || Kitt Peak || Spacewatch || NYS || align=right data-sort-value="0.63" | 630 m || 
|-id=726 bgcolor=#d6d6d6
| 455726 ||  || — || April 8, 2005 || Socorro || LINEAR || — || align=right | 5.0 km || 
|-id=727 bgcolor=#fefefe
| 455727 ||  || — || April 10, 2005 || Kitt Peak || Spacewatch || NYS || align=right data-sort-value="0.62" | 620 m || 
|-id=728 bgcolor=#fefefe
| 455728 ||  || — || April 10, 2005 || Kitt Peak || Spacewatch || MAS || align=right data-sort-value="0.62" | 620 m || 
|-id=729 bgcolor=#d6d6d6
| 455729 ||  || — || April 10, 2005 || Mount Lemmon || Mount Lemmon Survey || — || align=right | 2.1 km || 
|-id=730 bgcolor=#d6d6d6
| 455730 ||  || — || April 12, 2005 || Socorro || LINEAR || Tj (2.94) || align=right | 3.8 km || 
|-id=731 bgcolor=#d6d6d6
| 455731 ||  || — || April 11, 2005 || Kitt Peak || Spacewatch || — || align=right | 3.1 km || 
|-id=732 bgcolor=#d6d6d6
| 455732 ||  || — || April 12, 2005 || Mount Lemmon || Mount Lemmon Survey || — || align=right | 2.6 km || 
|-id=733 bgcolor=#d6d6d6
| 455733 ||  || — || April 7, 2005 || Catalina || CSS || Tj (2.99) || align=right | 4.8 km || 
|-id=734 bgcolor=#d6d6d6
| 455734 ||  || — || April 12, 2005 || Anderson Mesa || LONEOS || — || align=right | 3.9 km || 
|-id=735 bgcolor=#fefefe
| 455735 ||  || — || April 10, 2005 || Kitt Peak || Spacewatch || MAS || align=right data-sort-value="0.65" | 650 m || 
|-id=736 bgcolor=#FFC2E0
| 455736 ||  || — || April 18, 2005 || Socorro || LINEAR || AMO +1km || align=right data-sort-value="0.97" | 970 m || 
|-id=737 bgcolor=#d6d6d6
| 455737 ||  || — || April 30, 2005 || Kitt Peak || Spacewatch || — || align=right | 3.2 km || 
|-id=738 bgcolor=#fefefe
| 455738 ||  || — || May 1, 2005 || Campo Imperatore || CINEOS || — || align=right data-sort-value="0.92" | 920 m || 
|-id=739 bgcolor=#fefefe
| 455739 Isabelita ||  ||  || May 2, 2005 || La Cañada || J. Lacruz || — || align=right data-sort-value="0.75" | 750 m || 
|-id=740 bgcolor=#FA8072
| 455740 ||  || — || April 15, 2005 || Catalina || CSS || — || align=right | 1.1 km || 
|-id=741 bgcolor=#d6d6d6
| 455741 ||  || — || May 4, 2005 || Anderson Mesa || LONEOS || — || align=right | 3.9 km || 
|-id=742 bgcolor=#fefefe
| 455742 ||  || — || May 4, 2005 || Kitt Peak || Spacewatch || — || align=right data-sort-value="0.80" | 800 m || 
|-id=743 bgcolor=#d6d6d6
| 455743 ||  || — || May 3, 2005 || Kitt Peak || DLS || — || align=right | 3.3 km || 
|-id=744 bgcolor=#fefefe
| 455744 ||  || — || May 3, 2005 || Kitt Peak || Spacewatch || — || align=right | 3.1 km || 
|-id=745 bgcolor=#E9E9E9
| 455745 ||  || — || May 4, 2005 || Kitt Peak || Spacewatch || MAR || align=right | 1.1 km || 
|-id=746 bgcolor=#fefefe
| 455746 ||  || — || May 8, 2005 || Mount Lemmon || Mount Lemmon Survey || — || align=right data-sort-value="0.85" | 850 m || 
|-id=747 bgcolor=#fefefe
| 455747 ||  || — || May 9, 2005 || Catalina || CSS || — || align=right data-sort-value="0.97" | 970 m || 
|-id=748 bgcolor=#fefefe
| 455748 ||  || — || May 9, 2005 || Anderson Mesa || LONEOS || — || align=right | 1.5 km || 
|-id=749 bgcolor=#E9E9E9
| 455749 ||  || — || May 10, 2005 || Kitt Peak || Spacewatch || — || align=right data-sort-value="0.84" | 840 m || 
|-id=750 bgcolor=#E9E9E9
| 455750 ||  || — || April 16, 2005 || Kitt Peak || Spacewatch || EUN || align=right | 1.00 km || 
|-id=751 bgcolor=#fefefe
| 455751 ||  || — || May 4, 2005 || Mount Lemmon || Mount Lemmon Survey || MAS || align=right data-sort-value="0.75" | 750 m || 
|-id=752 bgcolor=#fefefe
| 455752 ||  || — || May 1, 2005 || Palomar || NEAT || — || align=right data-sort-value="0.90" | 900 m || 
|-id=753 bgcolor=#E9E9E9
| 455753 ||  || — || May 2, 2005 || Kitt Peak || Spacewatch || — || align=right | 1.7 km || 
|-id=754 bgcolor=#E9E9E9
| 455754 ||  || — || May 4, 2005 || Kitt Peak || Spacewatch || — || align=right | 1.0 km || 
|-id=755 bgcolor=#E9E9E9
| 455755 ||  || — || June 2, 2005 || Mount Lemmon || Mount Lemmon Survey || JUN || align=right | 1.0 km || 
|-id=756 bgcolor=#E9E9E9
| 455756 ||  || — || June 17, 2005 || Mount Lemmon || Mount Lemmon Survey || ADE || align=right | 2.3 km || 
|-id=757 bgcolor=#E9E9E9
| 455757 ||  || — || June 17, 2005 || Mount Lemmon || Mount Lemmon Survey || EUN || align=right | 1.1 km || 
|-id=758 bgcolor=#E9E9E9
| 455758 ||  || — || June 28, 2005 || Palomar || NEAT || — || align=right | 1.8 km || 
|-id=759 bgcolor=#E9E9E9
| 455759 ||  || — || June 14, 2005 || Mount Lemmon || Mount Lemmon Survey || — || align=right | 1.3 km || 
|-id=760 bgcolor=#E9E9E9
| 455760 ||  || — || June 30, 2005 || Kitt Peak || Spacewatch || — || align=right | 1.4 km || 
|-id=761 bgcolor=#E9E9E9
| 455761 ||  || — || June 30, 2005 || Kitt Peak || Spacewatch || DOR || align=right | 2.3 km || 
|-id=762 bgcolor=#E9E9E9
| 455762 ||  || — || July 1, 2005 || Kitt Peak || Spacewatch || EUN || align=right | 1.2 km || 
|-id=763 bgcolor=#E9E9E9
| 455763 ||  || — || July 2, 2005 || Kitt Peak || Spacewatch || — || align=right | 2.2 km || 
|-id=764 bgcolor=#fefefe
| 455764 ||  || — || July 4, 2005 || Kitt Peak || Spacewatch || — || align=right data-sort-value="0.60" | 600 m || 
|-id=765 bgcolor=#E9E9E9
| 455765 ||  || — || July 4, 2005 || Mount Lemmon || Mount Lemmon Survey || — || align=right | 1.1 km || 
|-id=766 bgcolor=#FA8072
| 455766 ||  || — || July 5, 2005 || Mount Lemmon || Mount Lemmon Survey || — || align=right data-sort-value="0.49" | 490 m || 
|-id=767 bgcolor=#E9E9E9
| 455767 ||  || — || July 4, 2005 || Kitt Peak || Spacewatch || — || align=right | 2.4 km || 
|-id=768 bgcolor=#E9E9E9
| 455768 ||  || — || July 4, 2005 || Mount Lemmon || Mount Lemmon Survey || — || align=right data-sort-value="0.98" | 980 m || 
|-id=769 bgcolor=#E9E9E9
| 455769 ||  || — || June 27, 2005 || Kitt Peak || Spacewatch || ADE || align=right | 1.7 km || 
|-id=770 bgcolor=#E9E9E9
| 455770 ||  || — || June 18, 2005 || Mount Lemmon || Mount Lemmon Survey || — || align=right | 1.9 km || 
|-id=771 bgcolor=#E9E9E9
| 455771 ||  || — || July 3, 2005 || Palomar || NEAT || — || align=right | 1.0 km || 
|-id=772 bgcolor=#E9E9E9
| 455772 ||  || — || July 8, 2005 || Kitt Peak || Spacewatch || — || align=right | 1.5 km || 
|-id=773 bgcolor=#E9E9E9
| 455773 ||  || — || July 3, 2005 || Catalina || CSS || — || align=right | 3.1 km || 
|-id=774 bgcolor=#E9E9E9
| 455774 ||  || — || July 28, 2005 || Palomar || NEAT || critical || align=right | 2.0 km || 
|-id=775 bgcolor=#E9E9E9
| 455775 ||  || — || July 2, 2005 || Catalina || CSS || — || align=right | 2.7 km || 
|-id=776 bgcolor=#E9E9E9
| 455776 ||  || — || June 27, 2005 || Kitt Peak || Spacewatch || JUN || align=right | 1.1 km || 
|-id=777 bgcolor=#E9E9E9
| 455777 ||  || — || July 27, 2005 || Palomar || NEAT || — || align=right | 1.2 km || 
|-id=778 bgcolor=#E9E9E9
| 455778 ||  || — || August 4, 2005 || Palomar || NEAT || BRG || align=right | 1.5 km || 
|-id=779 bgcolor=#E9E9E9
| 455779 ||  || — || August 26, 2005 || Campo Imperatore || CINEOS || MIS || align=right | 2.7 km || 
|-id=780 bgcolor=#E9E9E9
| 455780 ||  || — || August 27, 2005 || Kitt Peak || Spacewatch || — || align=right | 1.2 km || 
|-id=781 bgcolor=#E9E9E9
| 455781 ||  || — || August 26, 2005 || Palomar || NEAT || — || align=right | 2.7 km || 
|-id=782 bgcolor=#E9E9E9
| 455782 ||  || — || August 28, 2005 || Kitt Peak || Spacewatch || — || align=right | 1.8 km || 
|-id=783 bgcolor=#E9E9E9
| 455783 ||  || — || August 29, 2005 || Kitt Peak || Spacewatch || — || align=right | 2.1 km || 
|-id=784 bgcolor=#E9E9E9
| 455784 ||  || — || August 27, 2005 || Palomar || NEAT || — || align=right data-sort-value="0.82" | 820 m || 
|-id=785 bgcolor=#E9E9E9
| 455785 ||  || — || August 28, 2005 || Kitt Peak || Spacewatch || — || align=right | 1.4 km || 
|-id=786 bgcolor=#E9E9E9
| 455786 ||  || — || August 28, 2005 || Kitt Peak || Spacewatch || critical || align=right | 1.3 km || 
|-id=787 bgcolor=#E9E9E9
| 455787 ||  || — || August 28, 2005 || Kitt Peak || Spacewatch || — || align=right | 2.1 km || 
|-id=788 bgcolor=#E9E9E9
| 455788 ||  || — || August 28, 2005 || Kitt Peak || Spacewatch || — || align=right | 1.3 km || 
|-id=789 bgcolor=#E9E9E9
| 455789 ||  || — || August 31, 2005 || Kitt Peak || Spacewatch || — || align=right | 2.4 km || 
|-id=790 bgcolor=#E9E9E9
| 455790 ||  || — || August 31, 2005 || Kitt Peak || Spacewatch || — || align=right | 1.0 km || 
|-id=791 bgcolor=#E9E9E9
| 455791 ||  || — || June 11, 2005 || Catalina || CSS || — || align=right | 2.7 km || 
|-id=792 bgcolor=#E9E9E9
| 455792 ||  || — || September 10, 2005 || Anderson Mesa || LONEOS || — || align=right | 2.0 km || 
|-id=793 bgcolor=#E9E9E9
| 455793 ||  || — || July 8, 2005 || Anderson Mesa || LONEOS || — || align=right | 2.0 km || 
|-id=794 bgcolor=#E9E9E9
| 455794 ||  || — || September 12, 2005 || Kitt Peak || Spacewatch || — || align=right | 1.6 km || 
|-id=795 bgcolor=#FFC2E0
| 455795 ||  || — || September 21, 2005 || Siding Spring || SSS || APOcritical || align=right | 1.2 km || 
|-id=796 bgcolor=#E9E9E9
| 455796 ||  || — || September 24, 2005 || Anderson Mesa || LONEOS || — || align=right | 2.0 km || 
|-id=797 bgcolor=#E9E9E9
| 455797 ||  || — || August 31, 2005 || Kitt Peak || Spacewatch || — || align=right | 1.5 km || 
|-id=798 bgcolor=#E9E9E9
| 455798 ||  || — || September 23, 2005 || Catalina || CSS || EUN || align=right | 1.1 km || 
|-id=799 bgcolor=#E9E9E9
| 455799 ||  || — || September 23, 2005 || Kitt Peak || Spacewatch || — || align=right | 2.1 km || 
|-id=800 bgcolor=#E9E9E9
| 455800 ||  || — || September 23, 2005 || Catalina || CSS || ADE || align=right | 1.9 km || 
|}

455801–455900 

|-bgcolor=#E9E9E9
| 455801 ||  || — || September 24, 2005 || Kitt Peak || Spacewatch || — || align=right | 1.4 km || 
|-id=802 bgcolor=#E9E9E9
| 455802 ||  || — || September 26, 2005 || Kitt Peak || Spacewatch || — || align=right | 2.2 km || 
|-id=803 bgcolor=#E9E9E9
| 455803 ||  || — || September 27, 2005 || Kitt Peak || Spacewatch || HOF || align=right | 2.2 km || 
|-id=804 bgcolor=#E9E9E9
| 455804 ||  || — || September 24, 2005 || Kitt Peak || Spacewatch || — || align=right | 1.7 km || 
|-id=805 bgcolor=#E9E9E9
| 455805 ||  || — || September 26, 2005 || Kitt Peak || Spacewatch || — || align=right | 1.6 km || 
|-id=806 bgcolor=#E9E9E9
| 455806 ||  || — || September 28, 2005 || Palomar || NEAT || — || align=right | 2.2 km || 
|-id=807 bgcolor=#E9E9E9
| 455807 ||  || — || September 29, 2005 || Kitt Peak || Spacewatch || — || align=right | 1.5 km || 
|-id=808 bgcolor=#E9E9E9
| 455808 ||  || — || September 25, 2005 || Kitt Peak || Spacewatch || — || align=right | 2.1 km || 
|-id=809 bgcolor=#E9E9E9
| 455809 ||  || — || September 25, 2005 || Kitt Peak || Spacewatch || — || align=right | 2.4 km || 
|-id=810 bgcolor=#E9E9E9
| 455810 ||  || — || September 25, 2005 || Kitt Peak || Spacewatch || — || align=right | 2.2 km || 
|-id=811 bgcolor=#E9E9E9
| 455811 ||  || — || September 29, 2005 || Kitt Peak || Spacewatch || — || align=right | 2.0 km || 
|-id=812 bgcolor=#E9E9E9
| 455812 ||  || — || August 31, 2005 || Kitt Peak || Spacewatch || — || align=right | 2.1 km || 
|-id=813 bgcolor=#E9E9E9
| 455813 ||  || — || September 24, 2005 || Kitt Peak || Spacewatch || — || align=right | 1.5 km || 
|-id=814 bgcolor=#E9E9E9
| 455814 ||  || — || September 29, 2005 || Mount Lemmon || Mount Lemmon Survey || — || align=right | 2.0 km || 
|-id=815 bgcolor=#E9E9E9
| 455815 ||  || — || September 30, 2005 || Mount Lemmon || Mount Lemmon Survey || MIS || align=right | 2.5 km || 
|-id=816 bgcolor=#E9E9E9
| 455816 ||  || — || September 30, 2005 || Mount Lemmon || Mount Lemmon Survey || — || align=right | 1.8 km || 
|-id=817 bgcolor=#E9E9E9
| 455817 ||  || — || September 30, 2005 || Anderson Mesa || LONEOS || — || align=right | 1.6 km || 
|-id=818 bgcolor=#E9E9E9
| 455818 ||  || — || September 29, 2005 || Mount Lemmon || Mount Lemmon Survey || — || align=right | 2.2 km || 
|-id=819 bgcolor=#E9E9E9
| 455819 ||  || — || September 30, 2005 || Mount Lemmon || Mount Lemmon Survey || — || align=right | 1.9 km || 
|-id=820 bgcolor=#E9E9E9
| 455820 ||  || — || September 30, 2005 || Mount Lemmon || Mount Lemmon Survey || — || align=right | 1.8 km || 
|-id=821 bgcolor=#E9E9E9
| 455821 ||  || — || September 25, 2005 || Kitt Peak || Spacewatch || WIT || align=right data-sort-value="0.99" | 990 m || 
|-id=822 bgcolor=#E9E9E9
| 455822 ||  || — || September 30, 2005 || Kitt Peak || Spacewatch || — || align=right | 1.4 km || 
|-id=823 bgcolor=#E9E9E9
| 455823 ||  || — || September 25, 2005 || Kitt Peak || Spacewatch || — || align=right | 1.8 km || 
|-id=824 bgcolor=#E9E9E9
| 455824 ||  || — || September 26, 2005 || Catalina || CSS || — || align=right | 2.1 km || 
|-id=825 bgcolor=#E9E9E9
| 455825 ||  || — || September 16, 2005 || Anderson Mesa || LONEOS || — || align=right | 2.9 km || 
|-id=826 bgcolor=#E9E9E9
| 455826 ||  || — || October 3, 2005 || Catalina || CSS || — || align=right | 1.8 km || 
|-id=827 bgcolor=#E9E9E9
| 455827 ||  || — || October 1, 2005 || Kitt Peak || Spacewatch || AGN || align=right data-sort-value="0.94" | 940 m || 
|-id=828 bgcolor=#E9E9E9
| 455828 ||  || — || September 1, 2005 || Kitt Peak || Spacewatch || — || align=right | 2.1 km || 
|-id=829 bgcolor=#fefefe
| 455829 ||  || — || October 1, 2005 || Mount Lemmon || Mount Lemmon Survey || — || align=right data-sort-value="0.56" | 560 m || 
|-id=830 bgcolor=#E9E9E9
| 455830 ||  || — || October 1, 2005 || Kitt Peak || Spacewatch || — || align=right | 1.4 km || 
|-id=831 bgcolor=#E9E9E9
| 455831 ||  || — || September 30, 2005 || Mount Lemmon || Mount Lemmon Survey || — || align=right | 2.0 km || 
|-id=832 bgcolor=#fefefe
| 455832 ||  || — || October 4, 2005 || Mount Lemmon || Mount Lemmon Survey || — || align=right data-sort-value="0.49" | 490 m || 
|-id=833 bgcolor=#E9E9E9
| 455833 ||  || — || September 8, 2005 || Socorro || LINEAR || — || align=right | 2.6 km || 
|-id=834 bgcolor=#E9E9E9
| 455834 ||  || — || September 24, 2005 || Kitt Peak || Spacewatch || — || align=right | 1.8 km || 
|-id=835 bgcolor=#E9E9E9
| 455835 ||  || — || October 3, 2005 || Kitt Peak || Spacewatch || — || align=right | 2.0 km || 
|-id=836 bgcolor=#E9E9E9
| 455836 ||  || — || September 25, 2005 || Kitt Peak || Spacewatch || — || align=right | 1.9 km || 
|-id=837 bgcolor=#E9E9E9
| 455837 ||  || — || September 29, 2005 || Mount Lemmon || Mount Lemmon Survey || — || align=right | 2.0 km || 
|-id=838 bgcolor=#E9E9E9
| 455838 ||  || — || October 6, 2005 || Mount Lemmon || Mount Lemmon Survey || — || align=right | 2.0 km || 
|-id=839 bgcolor=#E9E9E9
| 455839 ||  || — || October 6, 2005 || Mount Lemmon || Mount Lemmon Survey || — || align=right | 1.9 km || 
|-id=840 bgcolor=#E9E9E9
| 455840 ||  || — || October 6, 2005 || Mount Lemmon || Mount Lemmon Survey || AGN || align=right data-sort-value="0.90" | 900 m || 
|-id=841 bgcolor=#E9E9E9
| 455841 ||  || — || October 1, 2005 || Catalina || CSS || — || align=right | 2.2 km || 
|-id=842 bgcolor=#E9E9E9
| 455842 ||  || — || September 27, 2005 || Kitt Peak || Spacewatch || — || align=right | 2.0 km || 
|-id=843 bgcolor=#E9E9E9
| 455843 ||  || — || October 7, 2005 || Kitt Peak || Spacewatch || — || align=right | 2.1 km || 
|-id=844 bgcolor=#E9E9E9
| 455844 ||  || — || September 29, 2005 || Mount Lemmon || Mount Lemmon Survey || — || align=right | 1.5 km || 
|-id=845 bgcolor=#E9E9E9
| 455845 ||  || — || October 1, 2005 || Mount Lemmon || Mount Lemmon Survey || — || align=right | 2.2 km || 
|-id=846 bgcolor=#E9E9E9
| 455846 ||  || — || September 29, 2005 || Kitt Peak || Spacewatch || — || align=right | 1.6 km || 
|-id=847 bgcolor=#fefefe
| 455847 ||  || — || September 26, 2005 || Kitt Peak || Spacewatch || critical || align=right data-sort-value="0.52" | 520 m || 
|-id=848 bgcolor=#E9E9E9
| 455848 ||  || — || October 2, 2005 || Mount Lemmon || Mount Lemmon Survey || — || align=right | 2.3 km || 
|-id=849 bgcolor=#E9E9E9
| 455849 ||  || — || October 5, 2005 || Mount Lemmon || Mount Lemmon Survey || MAR || align=right data-sort-value="0.98" | 980 m || 
|-id=850 bgcolor=#E9E9E9
| 455850 ||  || — || October 1, 2005 || Kitt Peak || Spacewatch || — || align=right | 1.7 km || 
|-id=851 bgcolor=#fefefe
| 455851 ||  || — || October 25, 2005 || Kitt Peak || Spacewatch || H || align=right data-sort-value="0.78" | 780 m || 
|-id=852 bgcolor=#E9E9E9
| 455852 ||  || — || October 9, 2005 || Kitt Peak || Spacewatch || — || align=right | 1.5 km || 
|-id=853 bgcolor=#E9E9E9
| 455853 ||  || — || October 9, 2005 || Kitt Peak || Spacewatch || WIT || align=right data-sort-value="0.90" | 900 m || 
|-id=854 bgcolor=#E9E9E9
| 455854 ||  || — || October 22, 2005 || Kitt Peak || Spacewatch || — || align=right | 2.1 km || 
|-id=855 bgcolor=#E9E9E9
| 455855 ||  || — || October 23, 2005 || Kitt Peak || Spacewatch || DOR || align=right | 2.2 km || 
|-id=856 bgcolor=#d6d6d6
| 455856 ||  || — || October 23, 2005 || Kitt Peak || Spacewatch || — || align=right | 1.7 km || 
|-id=857 bgcolor=#E9E9E9
| 455857 ||  || — || October 23, 2005 || Kitt Peak || Spacewatch || — || align=right | 2.3 km || 
|-id=858 bgcolor=#fefefe
| 455858 ||  || — || October 24, 2005 || Kitt Peak || Spacewatch || — || align=right data-sort-value="0.58" | 580 m || 
|-id=859 bgcolor=#E9E9E9
| 455859 ||  || — || October 24, 2005 || Kitt Peak || Spacewatch || HOF || align=right | 2.4 km || 
|-id=860 bgcolor=#E9E9E9
| 455860 ||  || — || October 27, 2005 || Kitt Peak || Spacewatch || — || align=right | 1.8 km || 
|-id=861 bgcolor=#fefefe
| 455861 ||  || — || October 22, 2005 || Kitt Peak || Spacewatch || — || align=right data-sort-value="0.77" | 770 m || 
|-id=862 bgcolor=#E9E9E9
| 455862 ||  || — || October 22, 2005 || Kitt Peak || Spacewatch || EUN || align=right | 1.5 km || 
|-id=863 bgcolor=#E9E9E9
| 455863 ||  || — || October 22, 2005 || Kitt Peak || Spacewatch || — || align=right | 2.0 km || 
|-id=864 bgcolor=#fefefe
| 455864 ||  || — || October 25, 2005 || Mount Lemmon || Mount Lemmon Survey || — || align=right data-sort-value="0.45" | 450 m || 
|-id=865 bgcolor=#E9E9E9
| 455865 ||  || — || October 10, 2005 || Catalina || CSS || — || align=right | 2.4 km || 
|-id=866 bgcolor=#E9E9E9
| 455866 ||  || — || October 24, 2005 || Kitt Peak || Spacewatch || — || align=right | 1.8 km || 
|-id=867 bgcolor=#E9E9E9
| 455867 ||  || — || August 30, 2005 || Kitt Peak || Spacewatch || — || align=right | 2.5 km || 
|-id=868 bgcolor=#E9E9E9
| 455868 ||  || — || October 25, 2005 || Anderson Mesa || LONEOS || JUN || align=right | 1.3 km || 
|-id=869 bgcolor=#E9E9E9
| 455869 ||  || — || October 2, 2005 || Mount Lemmon || Mount Lemmon Survey || — || align=right | 1.8 km || 
|-id=870 bgcolor=#fefefe
| 455870 ||  || — || October 22, 2005 || Kitt Peak || Spacewatch || — || align=right data-sort-value="0.62" | 620 m || 
|-id=871 bgcolor=#E9E9E9
| 455871 ||  || — || August 30, 2005 || Kitt Peak || Spacewatch || — || align=right | 2.0 km || 
|-id=872 bgcolor=#d6d6d6
| 455872 ||  || — || October 22, 2005 || Kitt Peak || Spacewatch || — || align=right | 2.1 km || 
|-id=873 bgcolor=#E9E9E9
| 455873 ||  || — || October 22, 2005 || Kitt Peak || Spacewatch || — || align=right | 2.6 km || 
|-id=874 bgcolor=#E9E9E9
| 455874 ||  || — || October 22, 2005 || Kitt Peak || Spacewatch || — || align=right | 2.0 km || 
|-id=875 bgcolor=#E9E9E9
| 455875 ||  || — || October 22, 2005 || Kitt Peak || Spacewatch || — || align=right | 1.8 km || 
|-id=876 bgcolor=#E9E9E9
| 455876 ||  || — || October 22, 2005 || Kitt Peak || Spacewatch || AGN || align=right | 1.3 km || 
|-id=877 bgcolor=#E9E9E9
| 455877 ||  || — || October 22, 2005 || Kitt Peak || Spacewatch || — || align=right | 1.8 km || 
|-id=878 bgcolor=#E9E9E9
| 455878 ||  || — || October 22, 2005 || Kitt Peak || Spacewatch || — || align=right | 2.2 km || 
|-id=879 bgcolor=#fefefe
| 455879 ||  || — || October 22, 2005 || Kitt Peak || Spacewatch || — || align=right data-sort-value="0.57" | 570 m || 
|-id=880 bgcolor=#E9E9E9
| 455880 ||  || — || October 22, 2005 || Kitt Peak || Spacewatch || — || align=right | 2.1 km || 
|-id=881 bgcolor=#E9E9E9
| 455881 ||  || — || October 1, 2005 || Socorro || LINEAR || — || align=right | 3.0 km || 
|-id=882 bgcolor=#E9E9E9
| 455882 ||  || — || October 12, 2005 || Kitt Peak || Spacewatch || PAD || align=right | 1.3 km || 
|-id=883 bgcolor=#E9E9E9
| 455883 ||  || — || October 5, 2005 || Kitt Peak || Spacewatch || AGN || align=right | 1.2 km || 
|-id=884 bgcolor=#E9E9E9
| 455884 ||  || — || October 24, 2005 || Kitt Peak || Spacewatch || — || align=right | 1.7 km || 
|-id=885 bgcolor=#E9E9E9
| 455885 ||  || — || October 24, 2005 || Kitt Peak || Spacewatch || — || align=right | 1.7 km || 
|-id=886 bgcolor=#d6d6d6
| 455886 ||  || — || September 29, 2005 || Mount Lemmon || Mount Lemmon Survey || KOR || align=right | 1.0 km || 
|-id=887 bgcolor=#E9E9E9
| 455887 ||  || — || October 25, 2005 || Mount Lemmon || Mount Lemmon Survey || AGN || align=right | 1.1 km || 
|-id=888 bgcolor=#E9E9E9
| 455888 ||  || — || October 26, 2005 || Kitt Peak || Spacewatch || AGN || align=right | 1.1 km || 
|-id=889 bgcolor=#E9E9E9
| 455889 ||  || — || October 1, 2005 || Mount Lemmon || Mount Lemmon Survey || DOR || align=right | 2.3 km || 
|-id=890 bgcolor=#E9E9E9
| 455890 ||  || — || October 26, 2005 || Kitt Peak || Spacewatch || — || align=right | 1.9 km || 
|-id=891 bgcolor=#E9E9E9
| 455891 ||  || — || October 26, 2005 || Kitt Peak || Spacewatch || AGN || align=right | 1.1 km || 
|-id=892 bgcolor=#E9E9E9
| 455892 ||  || — || October 26, 2005 || Kitt Peak || Spacewatch || — || align=right | 2.1 km || 
|-id=893 bgcolor=#E9E9E9
| 455893 ||  || — || October 26, 2005 || Kitt Peak || Spacewatch || — || align=right | 2.2 km || 
|-id=894 bgcolor=#E9E9E9
| 455894 ||  || — || October 24, 2005 || Kitt Peak || Spacewatch || — || align=right | 1.8 km || 
|-id=895 bgcolor=#E9E9E9
| 455895 ||  || — || October 24, 2005 || Kitt Peak || Spacewatch || — || align=right | 1.7 km || 
|-id=896 bgcolor=#E9E9E9
| 455896 ||  || — || October 24, 2005 || Kitt Peak || Spacewatch || — || align=right | 1.9 km || 
|-id=897 bgcolor=#E9E9E9
| 455897 ||  || — || October 24, 2005 || Kitt Peak || Spacewatch || — || align=right | 2.4 km || 
|-id=898 bgcolor=#E9E9E9
| 455898 ||  || — || October 24, 2005 || Kitt Peak || Spacewatch || — || align=right | 1.9 km || 
|-id=899 bgcolor=#E9E9E9
| 455899 ||  || — || October 24, 2005 || Kitt Peak || Spacewatch || — || align=right | 1.8 km || 
|-id=900 bgcolor=#d6d6d6
| 455900 ||  || — || October 24, 2005 || Kitt Peak || Spacewatch || KOR || align=right | 1.2 km || 
|}

455901–456000 

|-bgcolor=#E9E9E9
| 455901 ||  || — || October 26, 2005 || Kitt Peak || Spacewatch || AGN || align=right | 1.3 km || 
|-id=902 bgcolor=#E9E9E9
| 455902 ||  || — || October 27, 2005 || Mount Lemmon || Mount Lemmon Survey || — || align=right | 1.4 km || 
|-id=903 bgcolor=#d6d6d6
| 455903 ||  || — || October 27, 2005 || Mount Lemmon || Mount Lemmon Survey || — || align=right | 2.3 km || 
|-id=904 bgcolor=#E9E9E9
| 455904 ||  || — || October 1, 2005 || Kitt Peak || Spacewatch || — || align=right | 1.7 km || 
|-id=905 bgcolor=#E9E9E9
| 455905 ||  || — || October 24, 2005 || Kitt Peak || Spacewatch || — || align=right | 1.7 km || 
|-id=906 bgcolor=#d6d6d6
| 455906 ||  || — || October 1, 2005 || Mount Lemmon || Mount Lemmon Survey || — || align=right | 1.9 km || 
|-id=907 bgcolor=#E9E9E9
| 455907 ||  || — || October 25, 2005 || Kitt Peak || Spacewatch || DOR || align=right | 2.1 km || 
|-id=908 bgcolor=#E9E9E9
| 455908 ||  || — || October 27, 2005 || Kitt Peak || Spacewatch || — || align=right | 2.4 km || 
|-id=909 bgcolor=#E9E9E9
| 455909 ||  || — || October 25, 2005 || Kitt Peak || Spacewatch || — || align=right | 1.7 km || 
|-id=910 bgcolor=#E9E9E9
| 455910 ||  || — || October 25, 2005 || Kitt Peak || Spacewatch || — || align=right | 2.2 km || 
|-id=911 bgcolor=#E9E9E9
| 455911 ||  || — || October 25, 2005 || Kitt Peak || Spacewatch || DOR || align=right | 2.2 km || 
|-id=912 bgcolor=#E9E9E9
| 455912 ||  || — || October 25, 2005 || Kitt Peak || Spacewatch || — || align=right | 1.9 km || 
|-id=913 bgcolor=#E9E9E9
| 455913 ||  || — || October 25, 2005 || Kitt Peak || Spacewatch || AGN || align=right | 1.0 km || 
|-id=914 bgcolor=#E9E9E9
| 455914 ||  || — || October 25, 2005 || Kitt Peak || Spacewatch || — || align=right | 1.6 km || 
|-id=915 bgcolor=#E9E9E9
| 455915 ||  || — || October 25, 2005 || Mount Lemmon || Mount Lemmon Survey || — || align=right | 1.5 km || 
|-id=916 bgcolor=#E9E9E9
| 455916 ||  || — || October 28, 2005 || Mount Lemmon || Mount Lemmon Survey || — || align=right | 1.8 km || 
|-id=917 bgcolor=#E9E9E9
| 455917 ||  || — || October 23, 2005 || Catalina || CSS || — || align=right | 3.1 km || 
|-id=918 bgcolor=#E9E9E9
| 455918 ||  || — || October 22, 2005 || Kitt Peak || Spacewatch || — || align=right | 2.3 km || 
|-id=919 bgcolor=#E9E9E9
| 455919 ||  || — || October 25, 2005 || Kitt Peak || Spacewatch || — || align=right | 1.3 km || 
|-id=920 bgcolor=#E9E9E9
| 455920 ||  || — || October 25, 2005 || Kitt Peak || Spacewatch || — || align=right | 2.0 km || 
|-id=921 bgcolor=#E9E9E9
| 455921 ||  || — || October 26, 2005 || Kitt Peak || Spacewatch || — || align=right | 2.0 km || 
|-id=922 bgcolor=#fefefe
| 455922 ||  || — || October 27, 2005 || Bergisch Gladbach || W. Bickel || — || align=right data-sort-value="0.80" | 800 m || 
|-id=923 bgcolor=#E9E9E9
| 455923 ||  || — || October 24, 2005 || Kitt Peak || Spacewatch || AGN || align=right data-sort-value="0.97" | 970 m || 
|-id=924 bgcolor=#E9E9E9
| 455924 ||  || — || September 25, 2005 || Kitt Peak || Spacewatch || GEF || align=right data-sort-value="0.98" | 980 m || 
|-id=925 bgcolor=#E9E9E9
| 455925 ||  || — || October 26, 2005 || Kitt Peak || Spacewatch || HOF || align=right | 2.3 km || 
|-id=926 bgcolor=#fefefe
| 455926 ||  || — || October 26, 2005 || Kitt Peak || Spacewatch || — || align=right data-sort-value="0.77" | 770 m || 
|-id=927 bgcolor=#E9E9E9
| 455927 ||  || — || October 26, 2005 || Kitt Peak || Spacewatch || — || align=right | 2.2 km || 
|-id=928 bgcolor=#E9E9E9
| 455928 ||  || — || October 1, 2005 || Mount Lemmon || Mount Lemmon Survey || — || align=right | 1.6 km || 
|-id=929 bgcolor=#E9E9E9
| 455929 ||  || — || October 12, 2005 || Kitt Peak || Spacewatch || — || align=right | 1.2 km || 
|-id=930 bgcolor=#d6d6d6
| 455930 ||  || — || October 27, 2005 || Kitt Peak || Spacewatch || — || align=right | 2.1 km || 
|-id=931 bgcolor=#E9E9E9
| 455931 ||  || — || October 29, 2005 || Kitt Peak || Spacewatch || — || align=right | 1.9 km || 
|-id=932 bgcolor=#d6d6d6
| 455932 ||  || — || October 28, 2005 || Kitt Peak || Spacewatch || KOR || align=right | 1.1 km || 
|-id=933 bgcolor=#E9E9E9
| 455933 ||  || — || October 23, 2005 || Catalina || CSS || — || align=right | 1.8 km || 
|-id=934 bgcolor=#E9E9E9
| 455934 ||  || — || September 30, 2005 || Catalina || CSS || EUN || align=right | 1.2 km || 
|-id=935 bgcolor=#E9E9E9
| 455935 ||  || — || October 27, 2005 || Kitt Peak || Spacewatch || MRX || align=right | 1.1 km || 
|-id=936 bgcolor=#E9E9E9
| 455936 ||  || — || October 27, 2005 || Kitt Peak || Spacewatch || — || align=right | 2.6 km || 
|-id=937 bgcolor=#E9E9E9
| 455937 ||  || — || October 27, 2005 || Kitt Peak || Spacewatch || — || align=right | 2.0 km || 
|-id=938 bgcolor=#fefefe
| 455938 ||  || — || October 28, 2005 || Mount Lemmon || Mount Lemmon Survey || — || align=right data-sort-value="0.44" | 440 m || 
|-id=939 bgcolor=#E9E9E9
| 455939 ||  || — || October 25, 2005 || Kitt Peak || Spacewatch || AGN || align=right | 1.3 km || 
|-id=940 bgcolor=#E9E9E9
| 455940 ||  || — || October 25, 2005 || Kitt Peak || Spacewatch || — || align=right | 1.4 km || 
|-id=941 bgcolor=#fefefe
| 455941 ||  || — || October 27, 2005 || Mount Lemmon || Mount Lemmon Survey || — || align=right data-sort-value="0.57" | 570 m || 
|-id=942 bgcolor=#fefefe
| 455942 ||  || — || October 28, 2005 || Kitt Peak || Spacewatch || — || align=right data-sort-value="0.57" | 570 m || 
|-id=943 bgcolor=#E9E9E9
| 455943 ||  || — || October 28, 2005 || Kitt Peak || Spacewatch || — || align=right | 1.9 km || 
|-id=944 bgcolor=#E9E9E9
| 455944 ||  || — || October 28, 2005 || Kitt Peak || Spacewatch || — || align=right | 2.3 km || 
|-id=945 bgcolor=#E9E9E9
| 455945 ||  || — || October 28, 2005 || Kitt Peak || Spacewatch || HOF || align=right | 2.0 km || 
|-id=946 bgcolor=#E9E9E9
| 455946 ||  || — || October 23, 2005 || Catalina || CSS || — || align=right | 2.7 km || 
|-id=947 bgcolor=#E9E9E9
| 455947 ||  || — || October 30, 2005 || Socorro || LINEAR || GEF || align=right | 1.3 km || 
|-id=948 bgcolor=#E9E9E9
| 455948 ||  || — || September 13, 2005 || Anderson Mesa || LONEOS || — || align=right | 2.4 km || 
|-id=949 bgcolor=#E9E9E9
| 455949 ||  || — || October 31, 2005 || Mount Lemmon || Mount Lemmon Survey || — || align=right | 2.6 km || 
|-id=950 bgcolor=#E9E9E9
| 455950 ||  || — || October 23, 2005 || Catalina || CSS || — || align=right | 2.2 km || 
|-id=951 bgcolor=#d6d6d6
| 455951 ||  || — || October 24, 2005 || Mauna Kea || D. J. Tholen || — || align=right | 3.2 km || 
|-id=952 bgcolor=#fefefe
| 455952 ||  || — || October 26, 2005 || Kitt Peak || Spacewatch || — || align=right data-sort-value="0.57" | 570 m || 
|-id=953 bgcolor=#E9E9E9
| 455953 ||  || — || October 22, 2005 || Apache Point || A. C. Becker || — || align=right | 1.6 km || 
|-id=954 bgcolor=#E9E9E9
| 455954 ||  || — || October 28, 2005 || Mount Lemmon || Mount Lemmon Survey || — || align=right | 1.8 km || 
|-id=955 bgcolor=#E9E9E9
| 455955 ||  || — || October 29, 2005 || Mount Lemmon || Mount Lemmon Survey || AGN || align=right | 1.1 km || 
|-id=956 bgcolor=#FFC2E0
| 455956 ||  || — || November 1, 2005 || Mount Lemmon || Mount Lemmon Survey || APO || align=right data-sort-value="0.25" | 250 m || 
|-id=957 bgcolor=#E9E9E9
| 455957 ||  || — || October 29, 2005 || Catalina || CSS || — || align=right | 1.8 km || 
|-id=958 bgcolor=#d6d6d6
| 455958 ||  || — || October 12, 2005 || Kitt Peak || Spacewatch || KOR || align=right | 1.0 km || 
|-id=959 bgcolor=#d6d6d6
| 455959 ||  || — || October 25, 2005 || Kitt Peak || Spacewatch || KOR || align=right | 1.2 km || 
|-id=960 bgcolor=#d6d6d6
| 455960 ||  || — || October 25, 2005 || Kitt Peak || Spacewatch || KOR || align=right | 1.1 km || 
|-id=961 bgcolor=#E9E9E9
| 455961 ||  || — || September 29, 2005 || Catalina || CSS || — || align=right | 2.0 km || 
|-id=962 bgcolor=#d6d6d6
| 455962 ||  || — || October 25, 2005 || Kitt Peak || Spacewatch || — || align=right | 1.7 km || 
|-id=963 bgcolor=#fefefe
| 455963 ||  || — || November 6, 2005 || Kitt Peak || Spacewatch || — || align=right data-sort-value="0.67" | 670 m || 
|-id=964 bgcolor=#E9E9E9
| 455964 ||  || — || November 10, 2005 || Catalina || CSS || — || align=right | 2.2 km || 
|-id=965 bgcolor=#fefefe
| 455965 ||  || — || November 5, 2005 || Kitt Peak || Spacewatch || — || align=right data-sort-value="0.50" | 500 m || 
|-id=966 bgcolor=#E9E9E9
| 455966 ||  || — || October 25, 2005 || Kitt Peak || Spacewatch || — || align=right | 1.5 km || 
|-id=967 bgcolor=#E9E9E9
| 455967 ||  || — || October 28, 2005 || Kitt Peak || Spacewatch || — || align=right | 1.7 km || 
|-id=968 bgcolor=#E9E9E9
| 455968 ||  || — || November 11, 2005 || Kitt Peak || Spacewatch || — || align=right | 2.2 km || 
|-id=969 bgcolor=#E9E9E9
| 455969 ||  || — || October 24, 2005 || Kitt Peak || Spacewatch || — || align=right | 2.2 km || 
|-id=970 bgcolor=#E9E9E9
| 455970 ||  || — || November 11, 2005 || Kitt Peak || Spacewatch || — || align=right | 2.9 km || 
|-id=971 bgcolor=#E9E9E9
| 455971 ||  || — || November 1, 2005 || Apache Point || A. C. Becker || — || align=right | 1.4 km || 
|-id=972 bgcolor=#E9E9E9
| 455972 ||  || — || November 22, 2005 || Kitt Peak || Spacewatch || — || align=right | 2.4 km || 
|-id=973 bgcolor=#d6d6d6
| 455973 ||  || — || November 1, 2005 || Mount Lemmon || Mount Lemmon Survey || — || align=right | 2.0 km || 
|-id=974 bgcolor=#d6d6d6
| 455974 ||  || — || November 21, 2005 || Kitt Peak || Spacewatch || — || align=right | 2.0 km || 
|-id=975 bgcolor=#E9E9E9
| 455975 ||  || — || October 28, 2005 || Mount Lemmon || Mount Lemmon Survey || — || align=right | 1.9 km || 
|-id=976 bgcolor=#fefefe
| 455976 ||  || — || November 21, 2005 || Kitt Peak || Spacewatch || — || align=right data-sort-value="0.52" | 520 m || 
|-id=977 bgcolor=#E9E9E9
| 455977 ||  || — || November 21, 2005 || Kitt Peak || Spacewatch || — || align=right | 1.9 km || 
|-id=978 bgcolor=#E9E9E9
| 455978 ||  || — || November 12, 2005 || Kitt Peak || Spacewatch || — || align=right | 2.1 km || 
|-id=979 bgcolor=#E9E9E9
| 455979 ||  || — || October 25, 2005 || Mount Lemmon || Mount Lemmon Survey || — || align=right | 1.7 km || 
|-id=980 bgcolor=#E9E9E9
| 455980 ||  || — || October 30, 2005 || Mount Lemmon || Mount Lemmon Survey || — || align=right | 1.7 km || 
|-id=981 bgcolor=#fefefe
| 455981 ||  || — || November 28, 2005 || Catalina || CSS || — || align=right data-sort-value="0.77" | 770 m || 
|-id=982 bgcolor=#E9E9E9
| 455982 ||  || — || November 22, 2005 || Kitt Peak || Spacewatch || — || align=right | 2.3 km || 
|-id=983 bgcolor=#fefefe
| 455983 ||  || — || November 3, 2005 || Mount Lemmon || Mount Lemmon Survey || — || align=right data-sort-value="0.96" | 960 m || 
|-id=984 bgcolor=#E9E9E9
| 455984 ||  || — || October 1, 2005 || Catalina || CSS || — || align=right | 2.3 km || 
|-id=985 bgcolor=#E9E9E9
| 455985 ||  || — || October 10, 2005 || Catalina || CSS || DOR || align=right | 2.0 km || 
|-id=986 bgcolor=#E9E9E9
| 455986 ||  || — || October 31, 2005 || Kitt Peak || Spacewatch || — || align=right | 2.7 km || 
|-id=987 bgcolor=#E9E9E9
| 455987 ||  || — || November 6, 2005 || Mount Lemmon || Mount Lemmon Survey || — || align=right | 1.8 km || 
|-id=988 bgcolor=#E9E9E9
| 455988 ||  || — || October 24, 2005 || Kitt Peak || Spacewatch || — || align=right | 2.4 km || 
|-id=989 bgcolor=#fefefe
| 455989 ||  || — || November 29, 2005 || Kitt Peak || Spacewatch || — || align=right | 1.0 km || 
|-id=990 bgcolor=#fefefe
| 455990 ||  || — || November 25, 2005 || Mount Lemmon || Mount Lemmon Survey || — || align=right data-sort-value="0.80" | 800 m || 
|-id=991 bgcolor=#d6d6d6
| 455991 ||  || — || November 1, 2005 || Mount Lemmon || Mount Lemmon Survey || — || align=right | 2.4 km || 
|-id=992 bgcolor=#d6d6d6
| 455992 ||  || — || November 6, 2005 || Mount Lemmon || Mount Lemmon Survey || — || align=right | 2.5 km || 
|-id=993 bgcolor=#fefefe
| 455993 ||  || — || November 30, 2005 || Kitt Peak || Spacewatch || — || align=right data-sort-value="0.56" | 560 m || 
|-id=994 bgcolor=#E9E9E9
| 455994 ||  || — || October 1, 2005 || Kitt Peak || Spacewatch || DOR || align=right | 1.9 km || 
|-id=995 bgcolor=#fefefe
| 455995 ||  || — || December 1, 2005 || Kitt Peak || Spacewatch || — || align=right data-sort-value="0.56" | 560 m || 
|-id=996 bgcolor=#d6d6d6
| 455996 ||  || — || November 26, 2005 || Mount Lemmon || Mount Lemmon Survey || KOR || align=right | 1.4 km || 
|-id=997 bgcolor=#E9E9E9
| 455997 ||  || — || November 25, 2005 || Kitt Peak || Spacewatch || — || align=right | 2.4 km || 
|-id=998 bgcolor=#d6d6d6
| 455998 ||  || — || October 6, 2005 || Mount Lemmon || Mount Lemmon Survey || — || align=right | 2.3 km || 
|-id=999 bgcolor=#d6d6d6
| 455999 ||  || — || October 27, 2005 || Mount Lemmon || Mount Lemmon Survey || — || align=right | 3.7 km || 
|-id=000 bgcolor=#E9E9E9
| 456000 ||  || — || December 1, 2005 || Kitt Peak || M. W. Buie || HOF || align=right | 2.4 km || 
|}

References

External links 
 Discovery Circumstances: Numbered Minor Planets (455001)–(460000) (IAU Minor Planet Center)

0455